= Plantar calcaneal bursitis =

- Specialty: Podiatry

Plantar calcaneal bursitis is a medical condition in which there is inflammation of the plantar calcaneal bursa, a spongy fluid filled sac that cushions the fascia of the heel and the calcaneus (heel bone). It is characterized by swelling and tenderness of the central plantar heel area. It is sometimes called 'Policeman's heel'. It sometimes was, and should not be, confused with plantar fasciitis, which is inflammation of the plantar fascia and can affect any part of the foot.
