= History of the Houston Texans =

The history of the Houston Texans began in 2002, bringing the National Football League back to Houston, Texas after the city's previous franchise, the Houston Oilers, relocated to Nashville, Tennessee to eventually become the Tennessee Titans. The Texans are the newest franchise in the NFL. Despite some growing pains in the first nine years of their existence, the Texans became a more dominant team in the NFL's AFC South division in the 2010s, though they have yet to appear in a Super Bowl or a conference championship game.

== Bringing the NFL back to Houston (1997) ==
In June 1997, Bob McNair and Chuck Watson were bypassed by the National Hockey League in an attempt to bring a team to Houston, in part because of a lack of a suitable NHL arena.

Two weeks later, Houston found itself without professional football for the first time since 1959 as Houston Oilers owner Bud Adams got the final approval to move his team to Tennessee. A lawsuit filed by the city of Houston, Harris County, and other parties was settled with Adams paying millions of dollars for leaving town. In an interview with the Houston Chronicle, local entrepreneur and San Diego Padres owner John J. Moores, whose name was often attached to efforts to return the NFL to Houston, said that the city's football fans would be in for a long, dry spell without football and that he did not foresee another league expansion in the next 10 years. While efforts to get an NHL team in Houston faltered, McNair made his decision to set his sights higher and founded Houston NFL Holdings. Steve Patterson, who had been working with McNair in an attempt to bring the NHL to Houston, was immediately named as head of the new organization.

Now committed to the task at hand, McNair and Houston got an immediate morale boost in October 1997, when the NFL Stadium Committee reported to Commissioner Paul Tagliabue on the current attractiveness of Cleveland, Los Angeles, and Houston. Cleveland had lost the Browns in 1995 and had been promised by Tagliabue that the next expansion team would play there, bringing the league total to 31 teams. A future expansion to 32 teams seemed both logical and destined to happen, and Tagliabue praised McNair's strong initial efforts. Two days later, Houston Livestock Show and Rodeo (HLS&R) officials announced they would push for a domed stadium as part of the bid to lure the NFL back to Houston.

=== 1998 ===
In March 1998, McNair learned that the NFL officially awarded Cleveland its promised expansion franchise, making it the NFL's 31st team; NFL Commissioner Tagliabue said that the league would likely add a 32nd team in the next two years, with the three top candidates being Toronto (which would have been the NFL's first franchise outside the US, and the fifth largest market in North America), Los Angeles (North America's second largest media market, and the victim of two relocated franchises in the 1990s), and Houston (which was the fourth largest media market in North America and whose Oilers had been the most recent victim of franchise relocation).

Houston officials worried that Los Angeles would get the nod because of its media market size; in early May, those fears became reality as entertainment guru Michael Ovitz announced he would lead a largely privately financed $750 million project to build a stadium in Carson, California in hopes of landing the expansion team. However, both McNair and Ovitz stated that they needed to know the NFL's intentions regarding expansion by early 1999, lest they lose public support as a result of long delays while the league developed its plans.

In late October 1998, Tagliabue announced that the NFL owners would indeed expand the league to 32 teams, and would decide by April 1999 which city would be awarded the NFL expansion franchise. Meanwhile, Ovitz now had competition coming from his own market, as real estate developer Ed Roski announced a rival bid for a future Los Angeles team; his proposal centered around putting a 68,000-seat stadium inside the shell of the historic Los Angeles Coliseum.

=== 1999 ===
On March 16, 1999, the NFL owners, by a 29–2 vote, approved a resolution to award Los Angeles the expansion 32nd franchise. However, the award was contingent on the city's putting together an acceptable ownership team and stadium deal by September 15; if the parties could not reach an agreement or be close to doing so, the committee would then turn its recommendation to Houston.

A month later, NFL executives flew to Los Angeles. The executives were shocked at the lack of progress – Los Angeles would not allow tax dollars to be used for a new stadium, the competing groups were locked in a standoff as neither would concede its bid to the other nor would the groups agree to combine their efforts in attempts to put together a deal, and neither group was prepared to build a state-of-the-art facility, which Houston had promised in all its bids since 1997.

A return visit in late May yielded little change – Ovitz and Roski were still locked in a standoff; Roski's bid remained unchanged since the onset, while Ovitz unveiled plans to turn the area around the Coliseum into a 60-acre (240,000 m^{2}) complex of parks, parking garages, shopping areas and a brand-new stadium. Though Tagliabue and the NFL officials were pleased with the concept, they were daunted by the cost which included $225 million for parking garages, especially since neither Los Angeles nor the State of California was willing to commit the necessary funds. At this point, Tagliabue expressed his frustration with Los Angeles’ inability to get a plan together, and the next month he advised McNair to resume his discussions with the expansion committee.

On September 9, 1999, the league's expansion committee indicated that McNair and other Houston officials should be prepared to attend an October 6 meeting of the NFL owners in Atlanta. The NFL noted that the Los Angeles effort was still making no progress and now featured a three-way battle between Ovitz, Roski, and newcomer Marvin Davis. Although the league would still entertain an offer from any of the competing Los Angeles groups, the league would now consider an offer from McNair and Houston as well.

In the first week of October, Ovitz announced that his group was prepared to offer $540 million for the 32nd NFL franchise to be awarded to Los Angeles. However, later that week, McNair's Houston NFL Holdings proposed a bid of $700 million to the owners for the NFL to award the 32nd franchise to Houston instead; on the morning of October 6, 1999, McNair's persistence finally paid off as the NFL owners voted 29–0 to accept McNair's higher offer. In addition, Houston would host the 2004 Super Bowl, the second time the city would stage the event.

=== 2000 ===
After that, things moved fast for the yet-to-be-named football team. Focus groups were formed across the state to determine the image and direction for the franchise. NFL Properties and team officials began working on the identity, name and logo and the front office began to take shape with the hiring of former Washington Redskins General Manager Charley Casserly as Executive Vice President/General Manager in January 2000. During this time, a handful of team names were trademarked for potential use by the franchise, including Apollos, Bobcats, Challengers, Colt 45's, Energy, Hurricanes, Roughnecks, Roughriders, Roustabouts, Stallions, Stormcats, Texans, Texians, Toros, Wildcats, Wildcatters, and Wranglers.

On March 9, 2000, Houston celebrated the official groundbreaking of Reliant Stadium. The 69,500-seat state-of-the-art facility would become the NFL's first retractable-roof stadium.

After almost a year of speculation, the team was officially christened the Houston Texans during a downtown celebration on September 6, 2000, that included NFL Commissioner Paul Tagliabue and Bob McNair unveiling the new logo. McNair declared that he was positive about naming the team Stallions, but opted out of this since the horse imagery was overused in the league with the Denver Broncos, the Indianapolis Colts and the secondary logo of the San Diego Chargers. Texans was instead picked to be "something unique to Houston and the NFL", as well as representative of the bravery of Texas natives.

=== 2001 ===
On January 21, 2001, the Texans turned to the coaching staff and introduced Dom Capers as the club's first head coach. Capers had served the previous two seasons as the Jacksonville Jaguars' defensive coordinator. From 1995 to 1998, Capers was the head coach of the then-expansion Carolina Panthers. Capers would soon fill out the rest of the staff in the months to follow. After five long seasons, Houston was at last ready to rejoin the league.

== Play begins (2002–2005) ==
The Texans launched their inaugural campaign on August 5, 2002, against the New York Giants at Fawcett Stadium in the Pro Football Hall of Fame Game in Canton, Ohio, in front of 22,461 fans. The Texans' first season game was on September 8, 2002, against the Dallas Cowboys at Reliant Stadium. The two teams had also previously scrimmaged at the first home of Houston's previous team, the University of Houston's Robertson Stadium the month prior. Rookie David Carr hooked up with tight end Billy Miller on the third play from scrimmage for a touchdown (scoring the first points for the franchise). The Texans shocked their intrastate rivals 19–10, becoming just the third expansion team ever to win their first game (after the Minnesota Vikings in 1961 and the Baltimore Ravens in 1996). The Texans lost their next five games before winning for the first time on the road against the Jaguars, a team they would find success against in the seasons to come.

Victories over the New York Giants in Houston and the Steelers in Pittsburgh (despite just 46 total yards of offense – an NFL low for a winning team) and the Texans finished the season 4–12, sending two players (Gary Walker and Aaron Glenn) to the Pro Bowl, the most ever by an expansion team. The season was deemed a success despite David Carr being sacked an NFL record 76 times and the realization that left tackle Tony Boselli, the man they had hoped would protect their young quarterback, would never play a meaningful down for the team due to a botched shoulder surgery.

During the next two seasons, the Texans made steady progress. In 2003, they started out much as they had done in 2002 by shocking the heavily favored Dolphins in Miami to open the season. No other expansion team had ever won the season opener in each of its first two seasons. The Texans would only improve their record by one game in that season, but after a victory over the eventual NFC champion Carolina Panthers and a tough overtime loss to the eventual Super Bowl champion New England Patriots, optimism was high going into 2004 that they could compete with any team in the league. That optimism soured, however, after the Texans started the ’04 season 0–3 and for the first time fans began to question the direction in which head coach Dom Capers and the front office were taking. No other expansion team had taken so long to win back-to-back games and expectations in the third season were growing. Finally, after their first victory of 2004 in Kansas City, the Texans came home and defeated the Oakland Raiders the following week to secure their first win streak in franchise history.

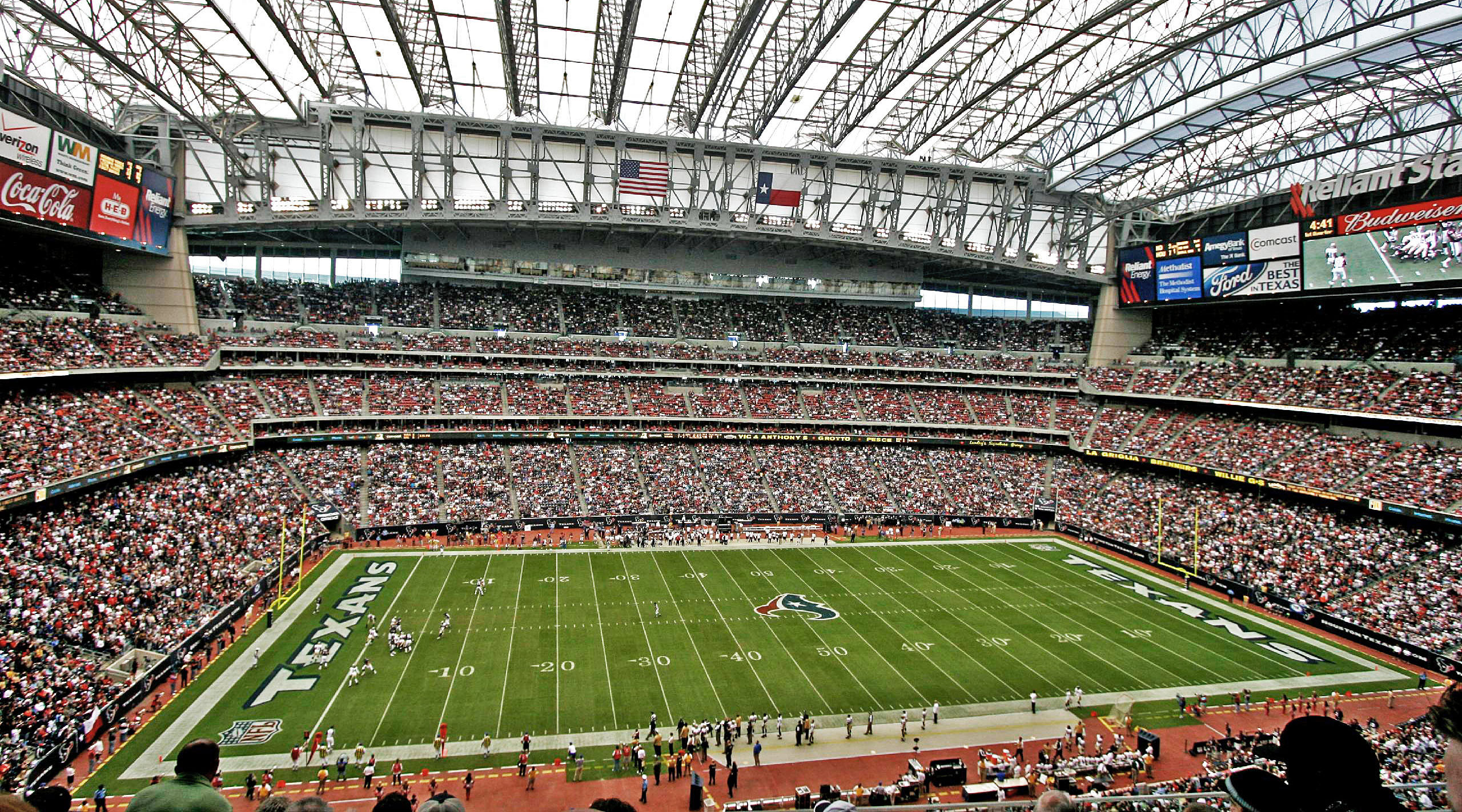
Reliant Stadium

After sweeping division rivals Tennessee and Jacksonville and another impressive pair of back-to-back wins late in the season, the Texans were poised to finish the year 8–8. All they had to do was beat the 3-12 Cleveland Browns at home. The Texans came out flat and unprepared, however, and fell to the Browns 22–14. The game served as an omen of bad times ahead. On the bright side, second year receiver Andre Johnson was selected to his first Pro Bowl and it was the first (and, until 2008, only) season that the Texans did not finish last in the AFC South.

Despite the disappointing end to the 2004 season and a troubling preseason, a playoff push by the Texans in 2005 still seemed likely. They got hammered by the Bills in Buffalo 22–7 to open the season and then humiliated by the Steelers at home 27–7 the following week. As the losses mounted, whatever optimism that was left over from the previous year faded away. Offensive Coordinator Chris Palmer was replaced before the third week and media and fans began to point to questionable personnel decisions and lackluster draft picks by General Manager Charley Casserly and doubt about Dom Capers ability to lead the team in the future began to surface. They started the season 0–6 before beating the Browns in Houston only to follow that up with another six-game losing streak. By the end of the season most were calling for Dom Capers and Charley Casserly to be fired. Conspiracy theories that the Texans were tanking games to secure the number one pick after several close losses late in the year culminated with the "Bush Bowl" in San Francisco during the last week of the season. The Texans and 49ers came into the game with the two worst records in the NFL and the loser would "win" the right to choose USC running back Reggie Bush in the 2006 NFL Draft. The Texans lost 20–17 and finished 2–14, the worst in the league. One bright spot was the sensational rookie season by kick returner Jerome Mathis who returned two kicks back for touchdowns, including one for 99-yards against Kansas City. Mathis was Houston's only player in 2005 to be selected to the Pro Bowl. In 2004 Tony Wyllie and the public relations office of the Texans was awarded the team's first Pete Rozelle award, given out by the Pro Football Writers of America. Wyllie and the team would also receive the same award in 2007.

After finishing 2–14 in 2005 the Texans fired Dom Capers and most of his staff. General Manager Charley Casserly was spared, but would eventually leave after the draft, replaced by Rick Smith. Gary Kubiak, offensive coordinator of the Denver Broncos and a Houston native, was hired to take over and the franchise headed into the most controversial off-season in team history. While most in the national media believed that the Texans drafting Reggie Bush in the 2006 Draft was a no-brainer, many in Houston began to voice their desire for the team to draft hometown hero Vince Young after his performance in leading the University of Texas to victory over Bush's USC team in the Rose Bowl, that year's NCAA National Championship Game.

In February, after a vote of confidence from Gary Kubiak, the Texans exercised an $8 million bonus option for David Carr, guaranteeing he would be a Texan in 2006. Still, the debate between Bush and Young raged on for months over local sports talk radio and internet message boards. While support for Vince Young was mounting, most still thought Reggie Bush would eventually be drafted by the Texans.

In a stunning turn of events, however, the Texans shocked the NFL world on the eve of the NFL Draft by announcing that North Carolina State defensive end Mario Williams – not Reggie Bush or Vince Young – would be the team's choice for their number one pick. Fans were angered and shocked, many booed the choice during a public draft party at Reliant Stadium and the Texans were ridiculed by the national media for committing what many believed was the worst mistake in NFL Draft history. Comparisons to Michael Jordan and Sam Bowie were immediately being made and the endless second-guessing began. Reggie Bush fell to the New Orleans Saints and Vince Young was taken by the Titans. By drafting Williams, the Texans addressed their greatest need, yet it would turn out to be a public relations nightmare that would haunt them for much of the 2006 season. By the end of the year Bush and the Saints were on their way to the NFC Championship game and Young had won the Offensive Rookie of the Year Award. Mario Williams finished with 4.5 sacks and 47 tackles while suffering from debilitating plantar fasciitis for the entire season.

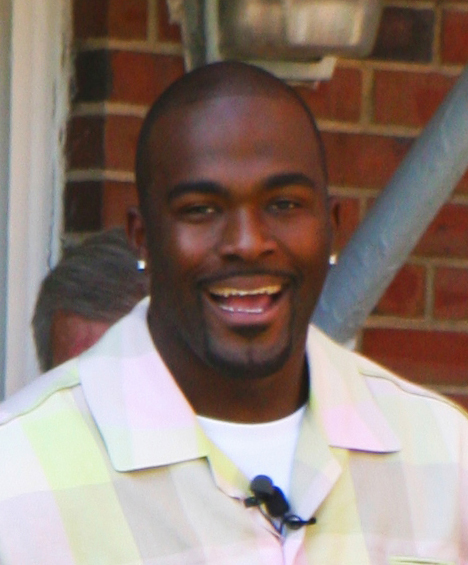
Mario Williams

== Gary Kubiak era (2006–2013) ==
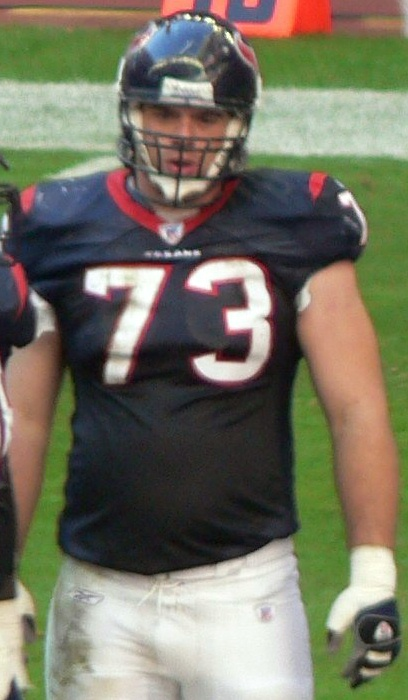
Texans' offensive tackle Eric Winston, 2006.

=== 2006 ===
On September 10, 2006, native Houstonian Gary Kubiak made his head coaching debut as he led the Texans against the Philadelphia Eagles at Reliant Stadium. Despite taking the first drive down the field for a touchdown, the game resulted in a disappointing 24–10 loss. They lost the next two in embarrassing fashion before awarding Kubiak his first career victory with a win over the Miami Dolphins in week four. After a loss to Dallas, two of the next four games would be against division rival Jacksonville – and Houston beat them both times. As unexplainable as the Texans’ continued ability to beat the Jaguars, so too was a game against the Titans where they out-gained Tennessee in total yards 427–197 but lost because of five turnovers.

The Texans went on to suffer two heart-breaking losses in their final eight games because of a weak defense, which proved to cost them their first breakeven season. They first allowed the Buffalo Bills to score a go-ahead touchdown with just nine seconds remaining, and then three weeks later Tennessee Titans QB Vince Young ran 39 yards for the winning touchdown in overtime. A week later, the emotionally exhausted Texans showed up in Foxborough to face the New England Patriots and were hammered 40–7.

The Texans made the most of the remainder of the season as Carr led the team to victories in what would prove to be his final two games as a Texan. Snapping a nine-game losing streak to the Indianapolis Colts, the Texans stunned the eventual Super Bowl Champions 27–24 as Carr went 16–23 with 1 TD and no interceptions or sacks; and finished the game with a 6-play, 31-yard drive to put Kris Brown in a position to kick the winning field goal. Carr finished the season by beating the Cleveland Browns in Houston; giving the Texans their first back-to-back wins in two years. The Texans finished 6–10 in 2006, four more wins than the previous year. Had it not been for the last minute defensive failures versus the Bills and the Titans, the Texans would have finished with their first breakeven season at 8–8, on the back of their rapidly improving offense.

In terms of individual performances, David Carr finished the season with a career-high 68.9% pass completion percentage and tied the NFL record of 22 for consecutive pass completions in the game versus the Buffalo Bills. The Carr-to-Johnson combination again proved to be formidable, as Andre Johnson led the league in receptions with 103 and was selected to his second Pro Bowl. Finally, the Texans got contributions from all seven of their 2006 NFL draft picks, including DE Mario Williams, TE Owen Daniels and LB DeMeco Ryans – a second round pick who was selected as the NFL's Defensive Rookie of the Year.

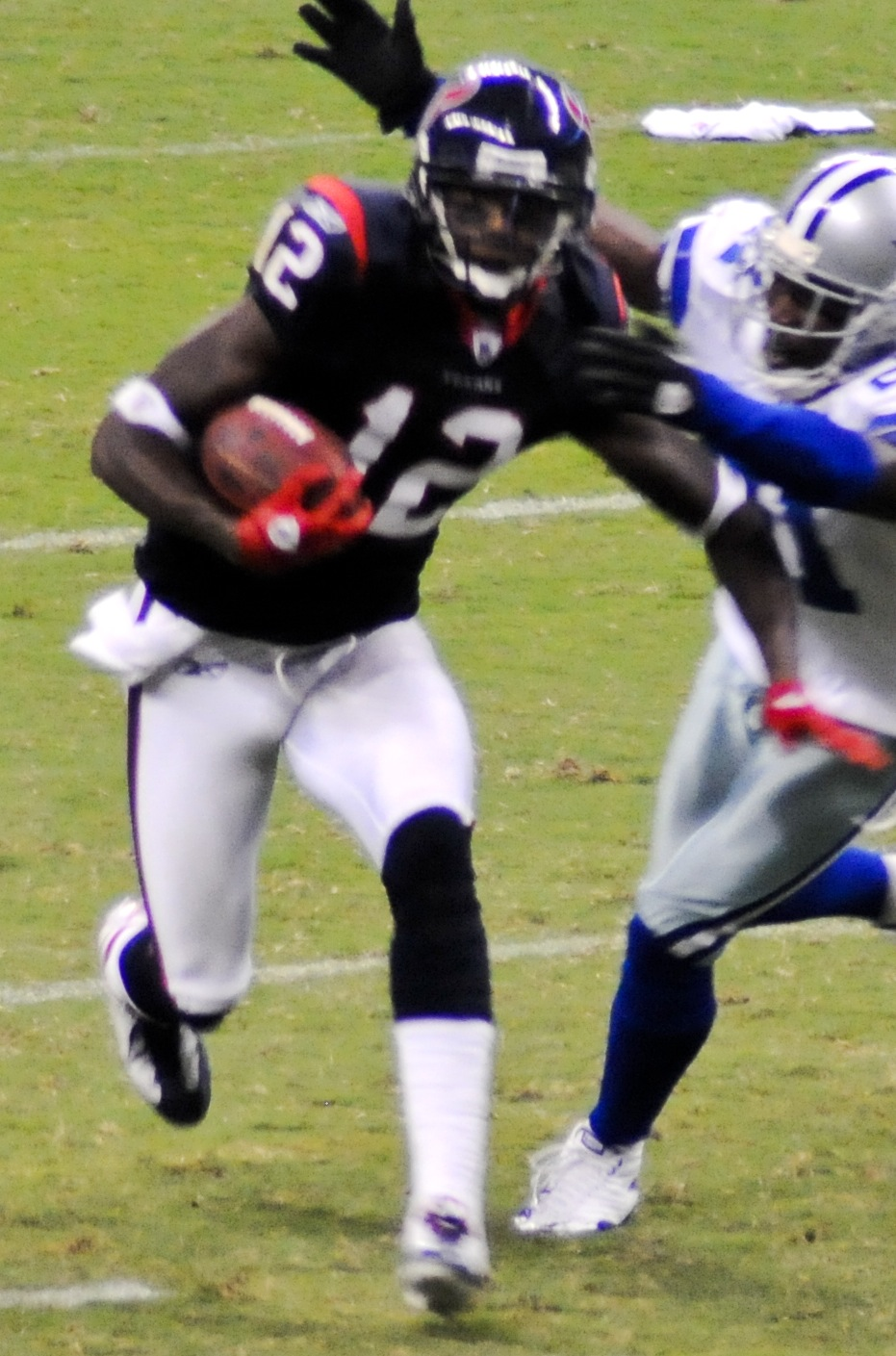
The Texans drafted Jacoby Jones in the 3rd round of the 2007 Draft. Jones played as a returner and a wide receiver in five seasons with the Texans.

=== 2007 ===
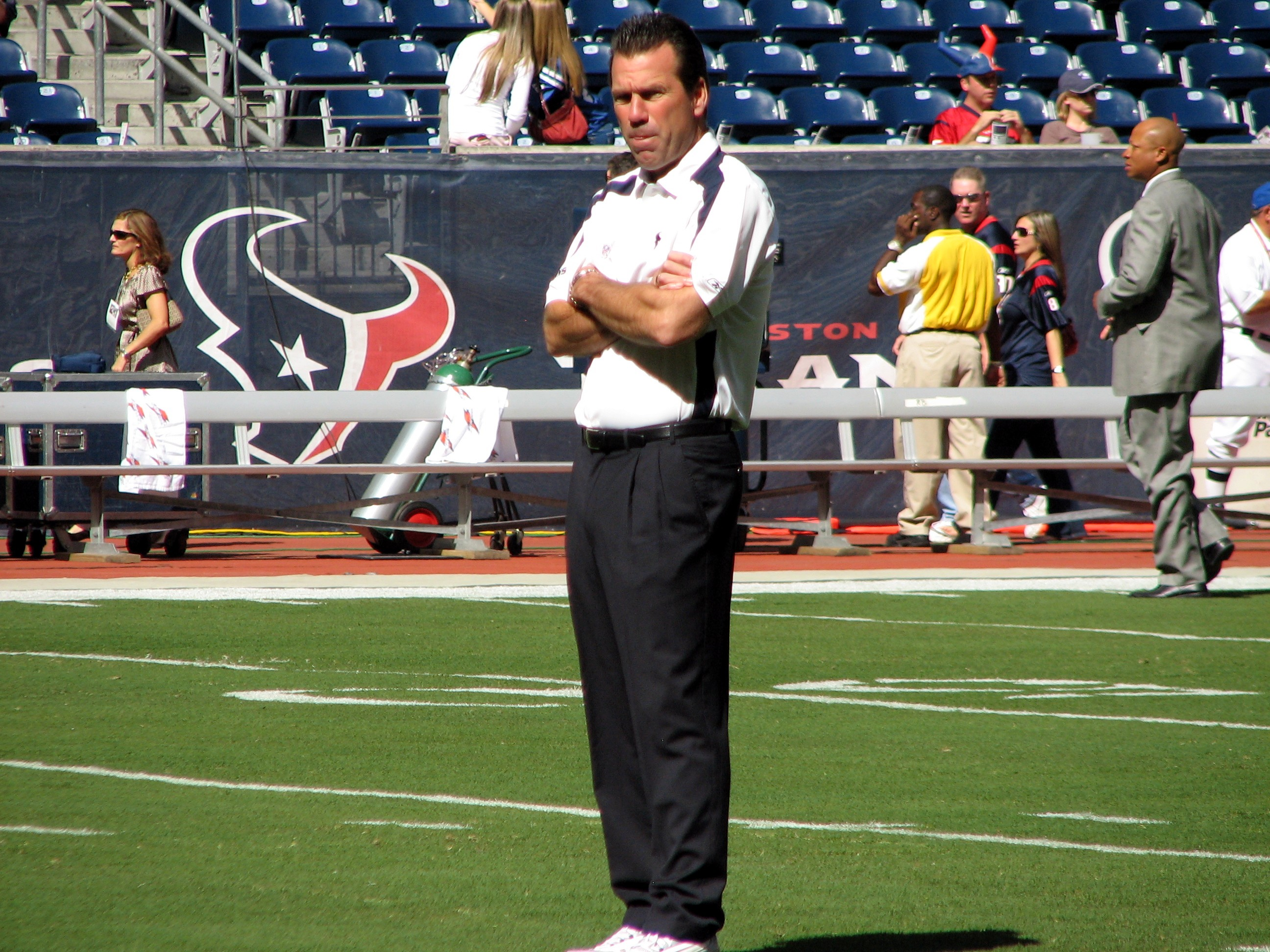
Gary Kubiak

Most of the speculation in Houston following the 2006 season involved David Carr and his future with the Texans. On March 21, reports surfaced that backup Atlanta Falcons QB Matt Schaub would be traded to the Texans. The Texans and Falcons swapped first round picks and the Texans gave Atlanta their second round pick in 2007 and 2008. Upon his introduction in Houston on March 22, Schaub was announced as the starting quarterback in 2007. Despite rumors that the Texans were attempting to trade him, the team granted the popular Carr an unconditional release so that the former #1 pick could shop for his own team. Carr had been sacked a staggering 249 times in his five years in Houston. On April 6, 2007; Carr joined the Carolina Panthers and became the starter after an injury to longtime Panthers Jake Delhomme ended his season. The Texans' first-round pick in 2007, DT Amobi Okoye, is the youngest player ever selected in the history of the NFL Draft. Okoye did not turn 20 until June 10, 2007.

For Matt Schaub and the Texans, the 2007 season started on a high note. They extended their franchise record two-game winning streak from the end of 2006 to four with victories at home against the Chiefs and on the road in Carolina. After the 2–0 start, however, the Texans would be plagued with injuries and turnovers. Matt Schaub missed five full games due to injury and major portions of two others. Former Pro-Bowl receiver Andre Johnson missed 7 games due to a knee injury. Dunta Robinson was lost for the season after a leg injury in a Week 9 game against Oakland, starting Center Steve McKinney suffered a season-ending injury in the third game of the season, and Ahman Green, who was signed in the offseason to a large contract, rushed for only 260 yards, missed several games and finished the season on IR. Despite all of this, the Texans would have one of the best seasons in franchise history, finishing with a .500 record for the first time ever, including going 6–2 at home and setting several team and individual records. The Texans had their best offense, setting team highs in points, average yards per play, total touchdowns, passing touchdowns, total yards and passing yards. Andre Johnson finished with a career and franchise high 8 touchdowns. Mario Williams set a franchise record with 14 sacks, finishing first in the AFC and tied for third in the league and DeMeco Ryans was selected as a starter in his first Pro Bowl. The Texans posted a 1–5 division record, finishing last in the AFC South, and a 7–3 record outside of their division. In 2007, Kris Brown became the first kicker in NFL history to make three field goals of 54 yards or longer in a single game, which included a franchise record 57-yard field goal to beat the Dolphins.

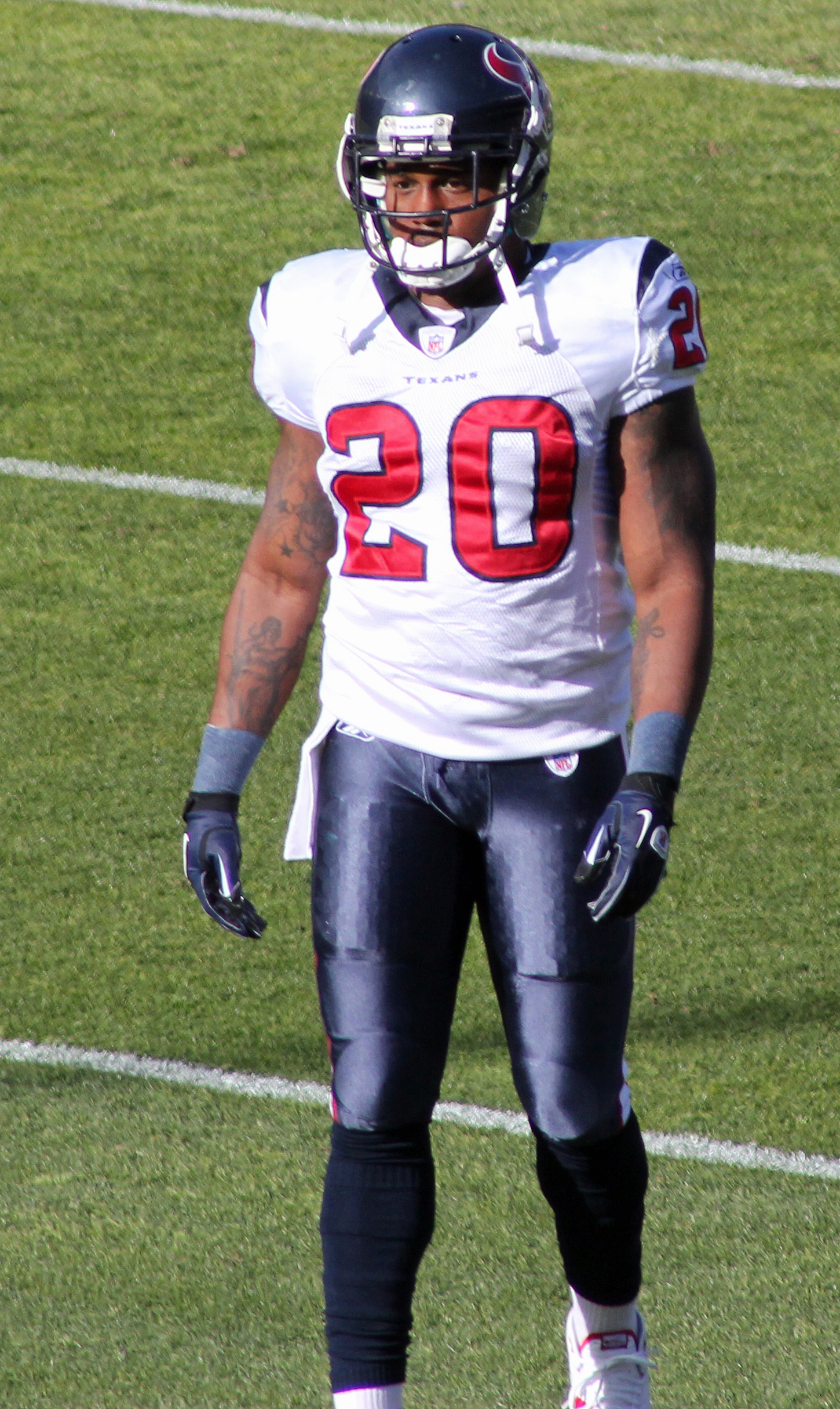
Steve Slaton

=== 2008 ===
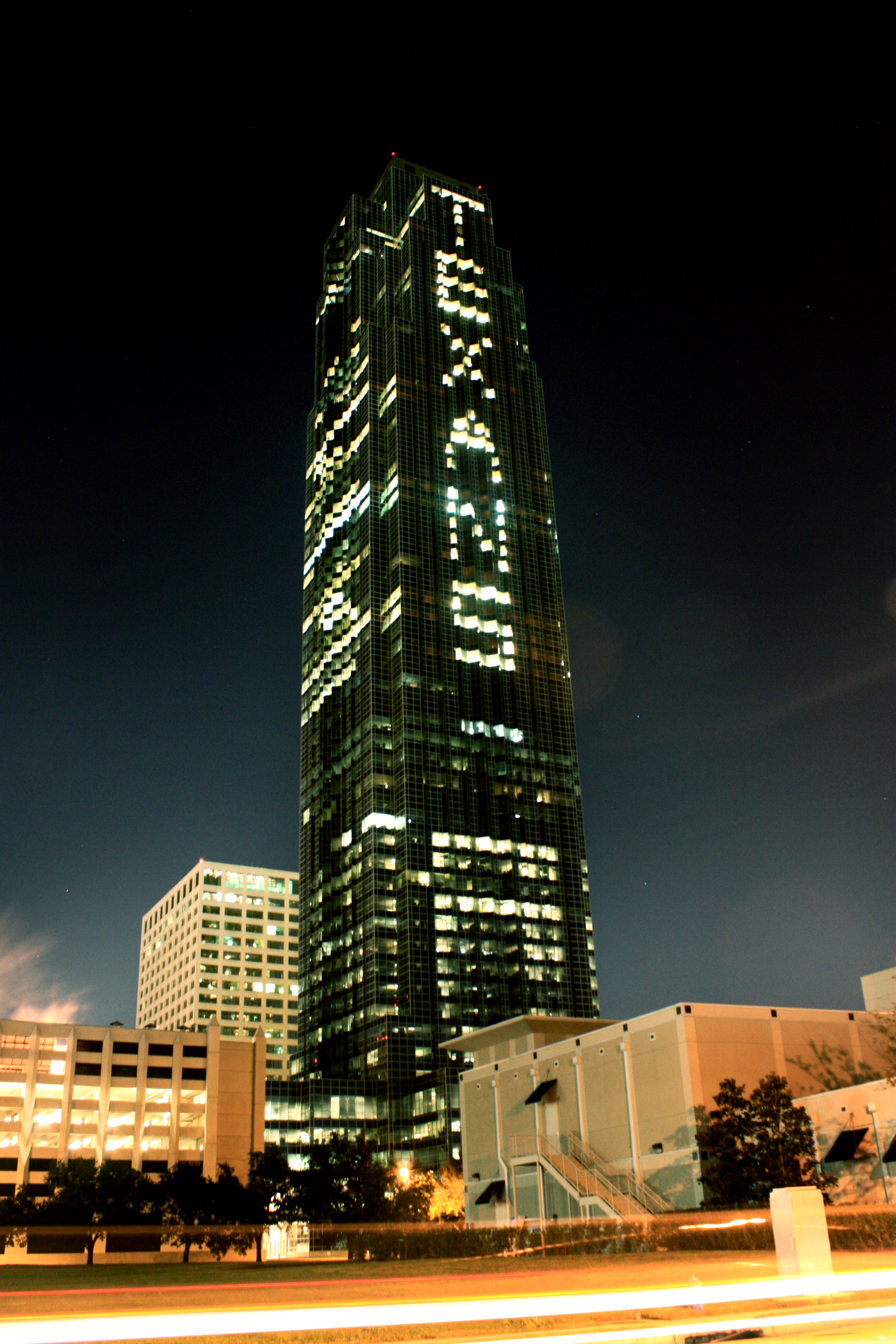
The Williams Tower in Houston showing the word "TEXANS" using its office lights.

The Texans opened the 2008 season with consecutive losses to the Pittsburgh Steelers 38–17, and the Tennessee Titans 31–12. Their week two home opener against Baltimore was rescheduled due to damage in and around the city of Houston Hurricane Ike forcing the Texans to play three consecutive road games before finally returning home in October. After back-to-back heartbreaking losses against Jacksonville and Indianapolis, the Texans secured their first win of the season against the Dolphins in dramatic come from behind fashion capped with a fourth and goal touchdown run by Matt Schaub with three seconds remaining in the game. The Texans then went on to beat Detroit 28–21. The following week they blew out the Bengals 35–6, the largest point differential in Texans history. They set a franchise record for consecutive wins with 4, after beating the Cleveland Browns, Jacksonville Jaguars, Green Bay Packers, and the Tennessee Titans. After a disappointing loss to the Oakland Raiders in Week 16 the Texans finished the 2008 NFL Season with a 31–24 win against the Chicago Bears, effectively playing spoiler and eliminating the Bears from a playoff spot that they would have secured with a win over the Texans. On December 1, 2008, the Texans defeated the Jacksonville Jaguars 30–17 in their first-ever game on Monday Night Football. Rookie Steve Slaton rushed for 130 yards and 2 touchdowns and caught 2 passes for 52 yards. Mario Williams had 3 sacks and a forced fumble, and Andre Johnson caught 7 passes for 75 yards and a touchdown.

They finished the season with an 8–8 record, tying the franchise record for wins in a season. Little did the Texans realize that their 2nd of two 3rd round picks in the 2008 NFL Draft, acquired via trade, would be one of their two best offensive players in 2008. Steve Slaton was the 10th running back selected in the draft, but wound up being the steal of the draft by leading all rookies with 1,282 yards rushing and 1,659 yards from scrimmage. Other highlights included Andre Johnson leading the NFL in receptions with 115 and receiving yards with 1,575. The Texans also sent three players to the Pro Bowl: Andre Johnson, Mario Williams, and Owen Daniels.

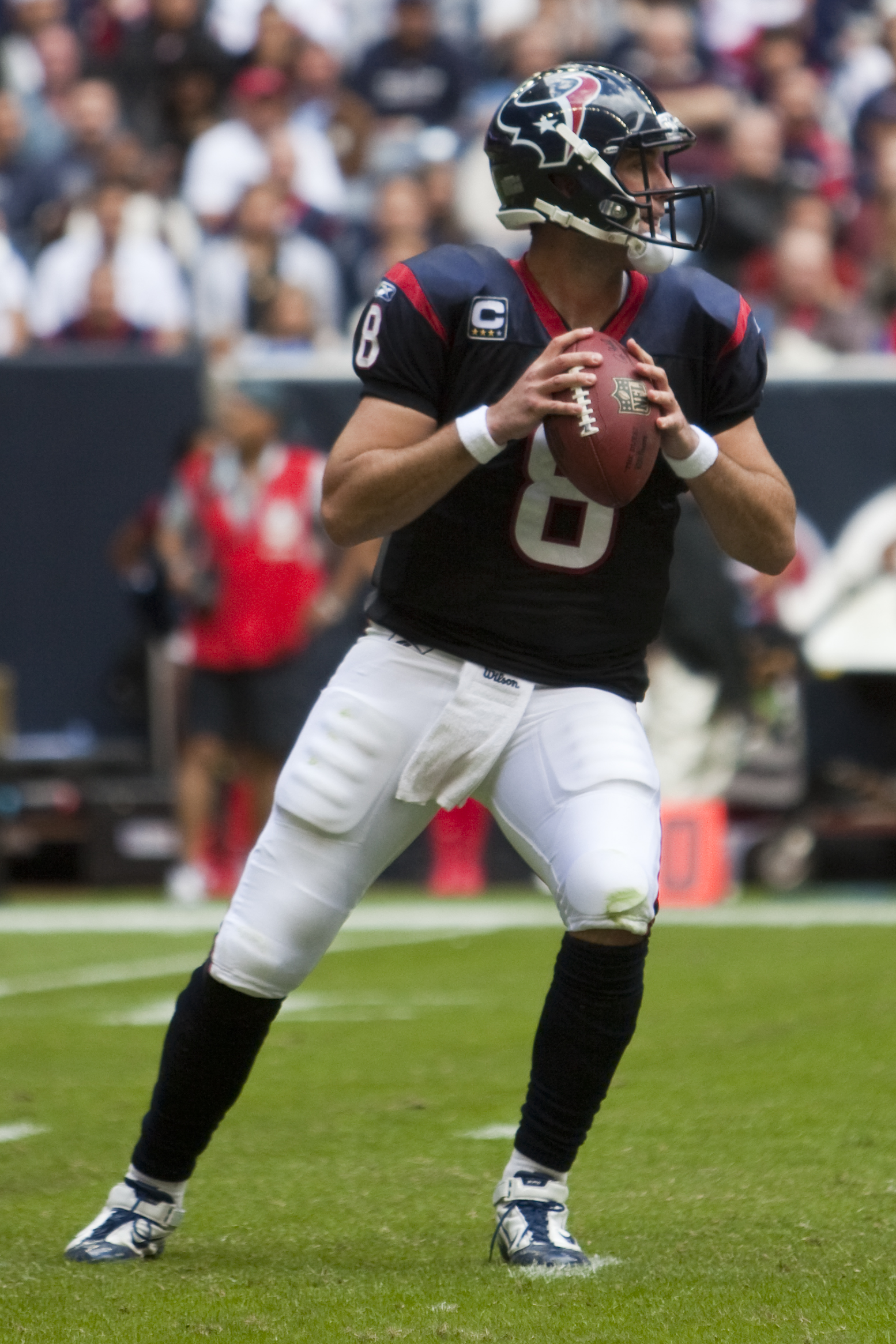
Matt Schaub drops back to pass in a 2010 game.

=== 2009 ===
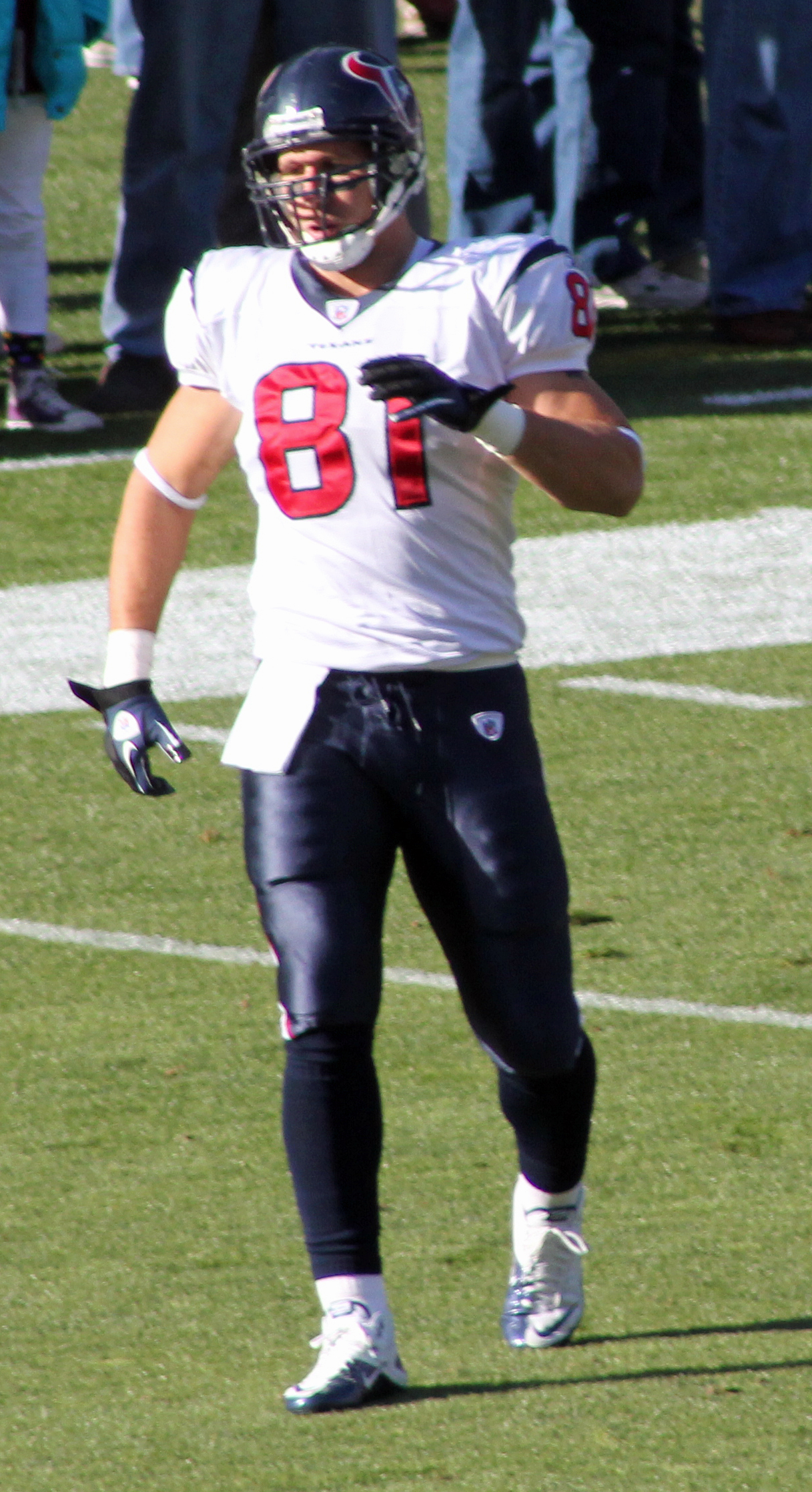
Owen Daniels

The Texans continued to see improvement in 2009. Despite losing their opening game against the New York Jets, the Texans went 5-3 through the first half of the season including a victory over division rival the Tennessee Titans in week 2. However this would prove to be their only division win of the season. The Texans suffered close losses in the next 4 games before closing out with 4 consecutive wins. Their final game, a come from behind victory over the New England Patriots would cap off the Texans' first ever winning season at 9–7, and keep faint hopes alive in Houston for a chance to make the playoffs for the first time in the short history of the franchise. However those hopes were short lived, with the Jets edging them out of the wild card spot with their victory against the Cincinnati Bengals later that night. The Texans 9–7 record tied both AFC wild card winners, the Jets and Baltimore Ravens, but the Jets and Ravens received precedence due to their superior records in conference games (both 7-5 versus Texans 6-6), leaving the Texans out of the postseason.

2009 was a record breaking season for quarterback Matt Schaub, finishing with 4,770 passing yards, the 6th most in a single season in NFL history, and a career-high season passer rating of 98.6. On the other side of the ball, wide receiver Andre Johnson had another extraordinary season with 1,569 receiving yards over 101 receptions.

Following the 2009 season, the Texans re-signed head coach Gary Kubiak to a contract extension leading through the 2012 season.

On September 7, 2010, the Texans signed QB Matt Leinart to a one-year deal, two days after he had been cut by the Arizona Cardinals.

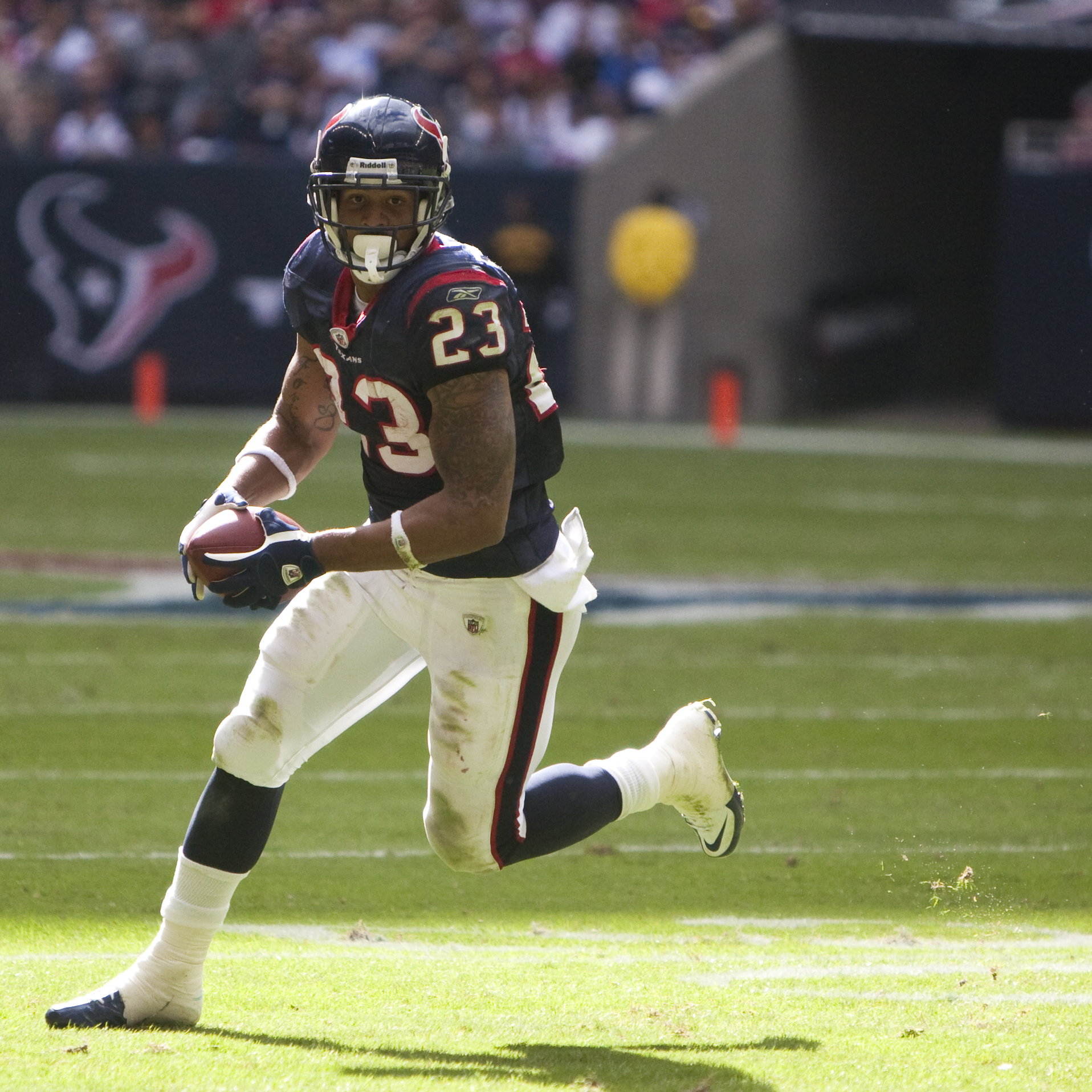
Arian Foster in 2010.

=== 2010 ===
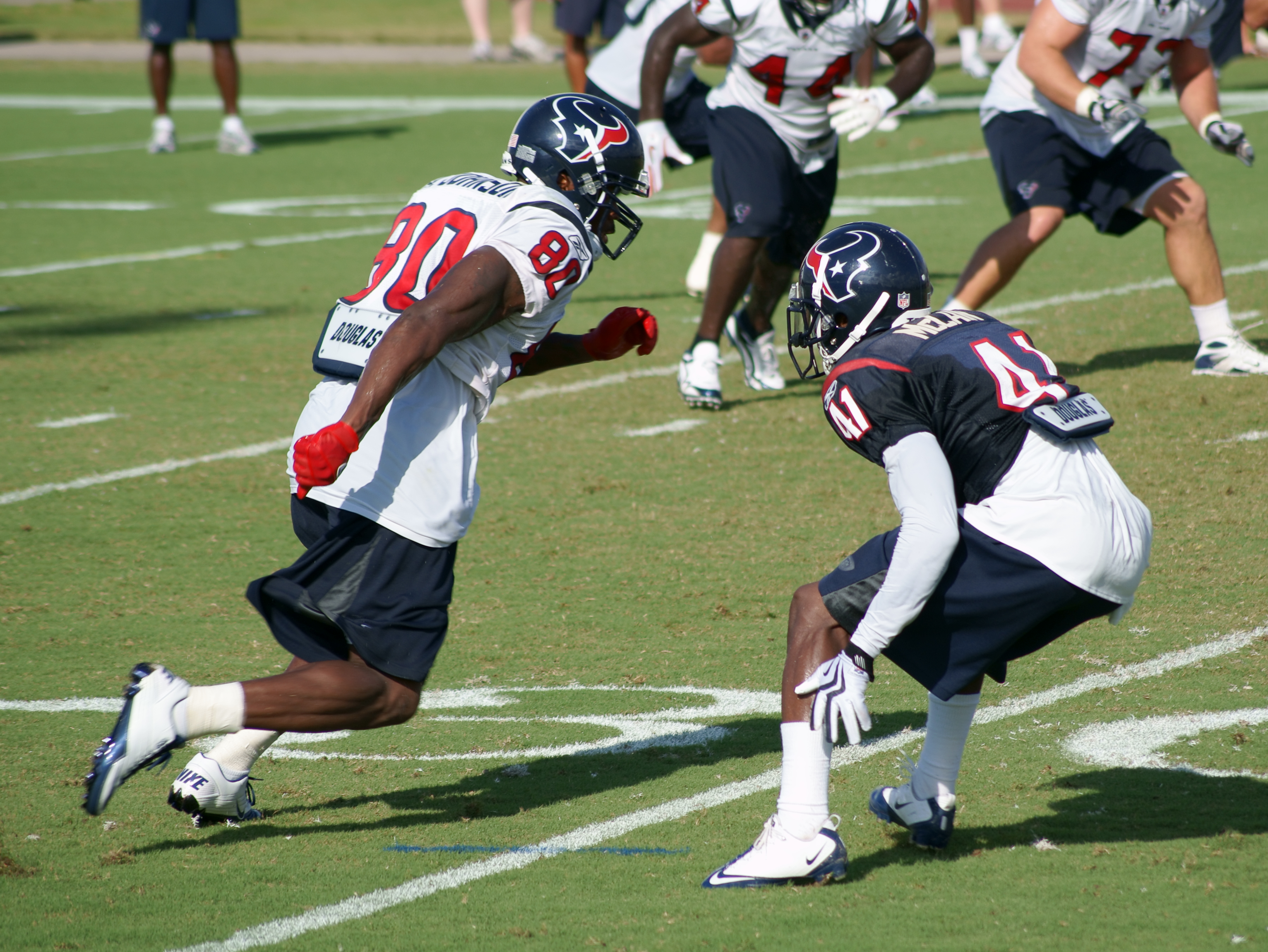
Andre Johnson (left) and Brice McCain (right) battle in Texans' training camp, 2010.

(WK:1)The Houston Texans opened their season with a win, beating the Indianapolis Colts 34–24. Arian Foster had 231 rushing yards, the first time rushing for over 200 yards in a game has been achieved by the Texans. (WK:3) The next week, they came back from a 17-point second half deficit to defeat Washington, 30–27 in their first overtime win. Schaub threw for a franchise record 497 passing yards.(WK:3) The very next week, they were defeated 27-13 by the Dallas Cowboys.(WK:4) Arian Foster, having sat out nearly the entire first half of the game, had his third game with over a hundred yards rushing. Andre Johnson did not play, due to an ankle injury. The Houston Texans defeated the Oakland Raiders 31–24. At the time, the Houston Texans were happy; the previous week had done exactly what it needed to do to make them division leaders once again, instead of being tied. The Jacksonville Jaguars, last in the AFC South division at the time, defeated the Indianapolis Colts, to cancel each other out, and be tied for second place in their division. The Tennessee Titans also lost to the Denver Broncos, therefore, also tied for second place in their division.

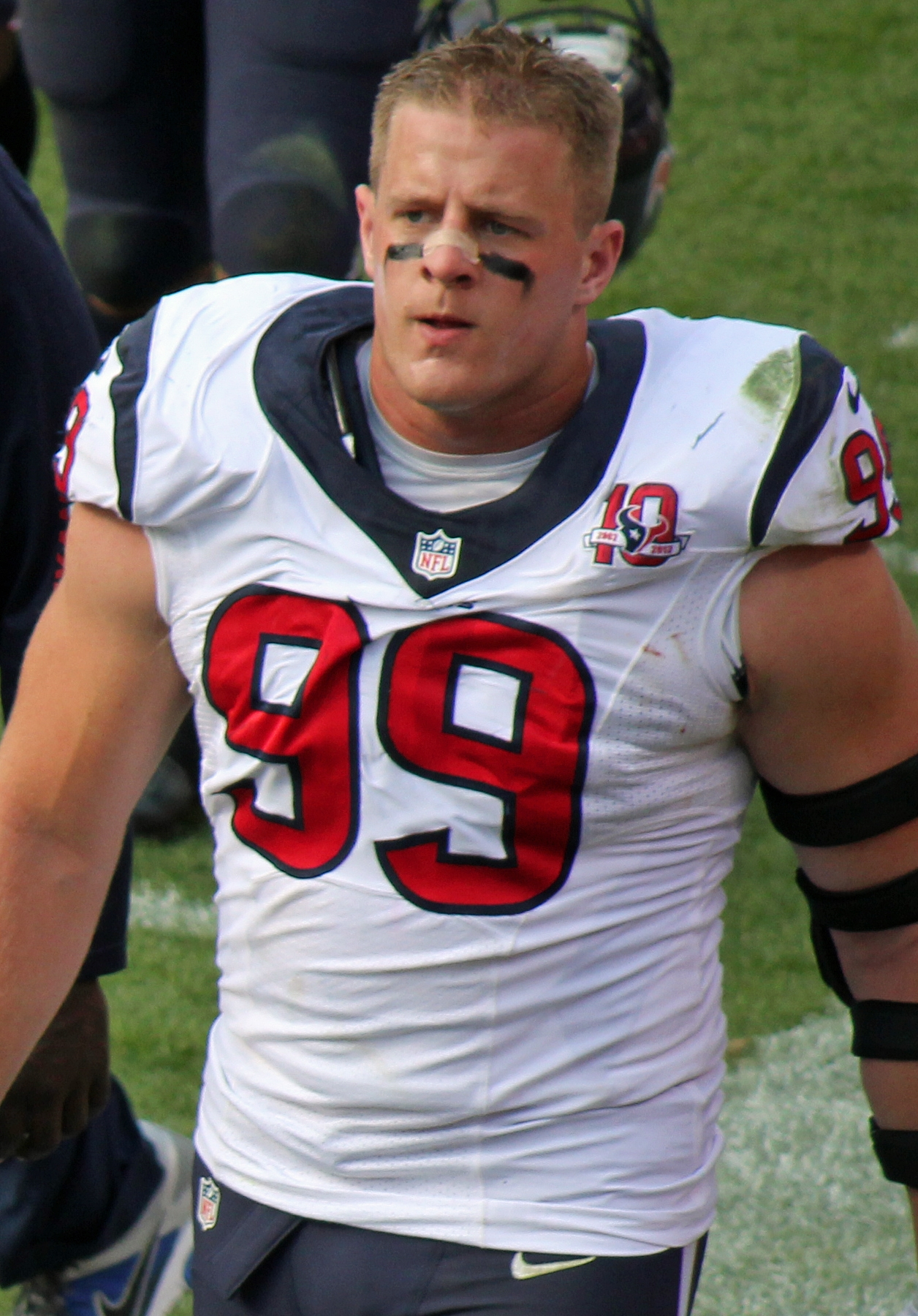
J. J. Watt in 2012

On January 3, 2011, the Texans announced that Kubiak would be retained as head coach, but they fired defensive coordinator Frank Bush and three defensive assistants. On January 5, ex-Cowboys head coach Wade Phillips was hired as defensive coordinator.

=== 2011 ===
Under Phillips' guidance and the additions of draft picks J. J. Watt, Brandon Harris, Roc Carmichael, Brooks Reed, and Shiloh Keo, the revamped Texans defense rose from 30th to second in the league. Despite lengthy injuries to Matt Schaub (replaced by T. J. Yates), Mario Williams, and Andre Johnson, the Texans went 10–6 in 2011 and won the AFC South to advance to the playoffs, both firsts in franchise history. They defeated the Cincinnati Bengals 31–10 in the Wild Card Game (the first playoff game held in Houston since 1994) but fell to the Baltimore Ravens 20-13 after three Yates interceptions and a muffed punt by Jacoby Jones.

=== 2012 ===
During the offseason, Mario Williams was not resigned in free agency, signing a massive 6-year, $96 million contract with the Buffalo Bills. Nonetheless, the Texans were able to repeat the AFC South title with a 12–4 record, and Watt was picked as Defensive Player of the Year. Once more, Houston defeated the Bengals in the wild card game 19–13, before the Texans were beaten in the divisional round by the New England Patriots, 41–28.

=== 2013 ===
The Texans collapsed in 2013, having to come from behind to win their first two games (against the Chargers and then Titans), and then went into freefall, losing their last 14 games, with nine losses by a touchdown or less. Matt Schaub struggled, throwing a pick-six in four consecutive games before getting injured and benched for Yates and rookie Case Keenum, and would eventually be traded to the Oakland Raiders following the season. Coach Gary Kubiak was fired with three games left on the season, and on January 3, 2014, former Penn State head coach Bill O'Brien was officially announced as the Texans' third head coach. The Texans earned the top overall pick in the 2014 NFL draft, picking edge rusher Jadeveon Clowney from South Carolina.

== Bill O'Brien era (2014–2020) ==
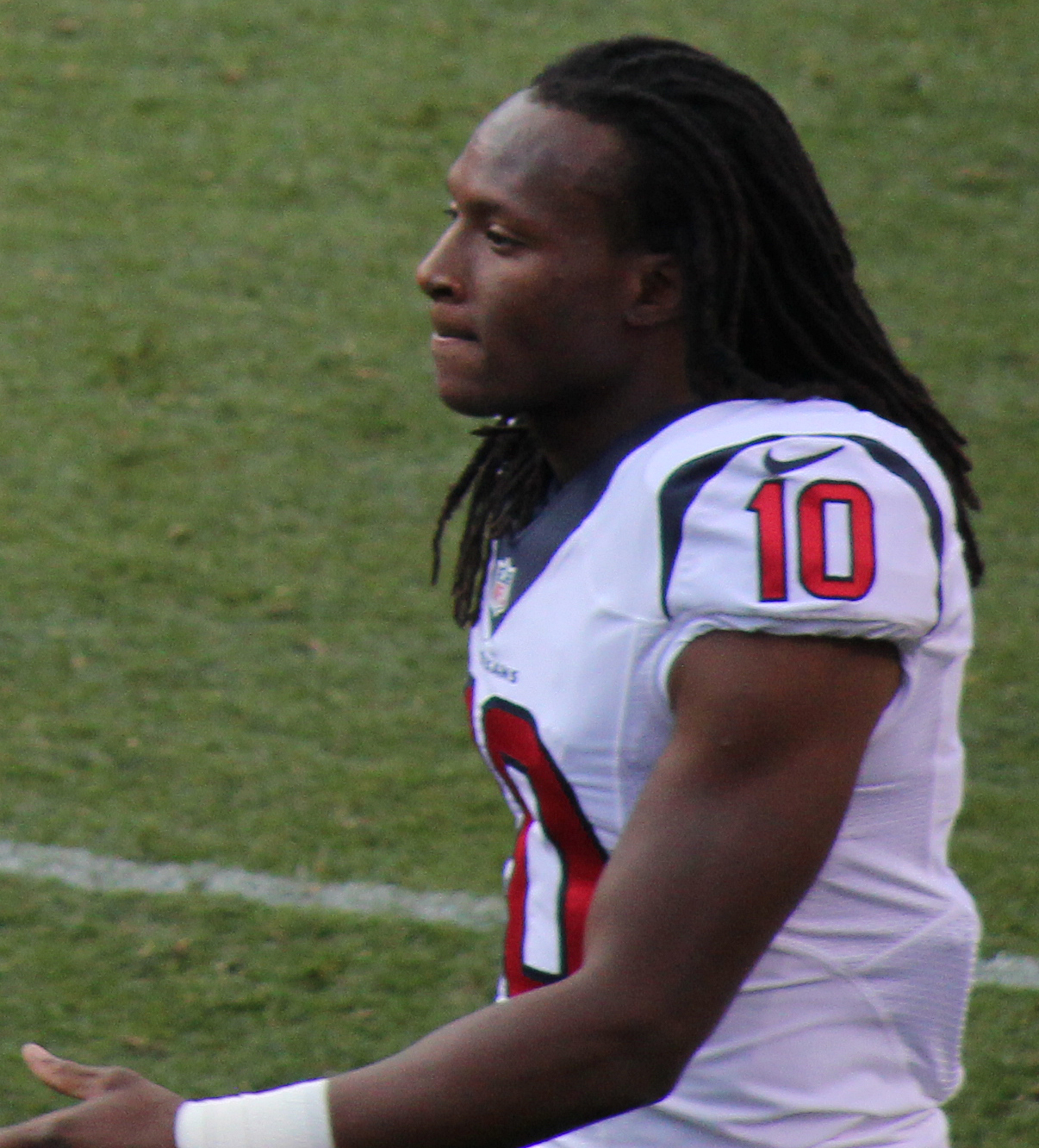
Wide receiver DeAndre Hopkins in 2014

=== 2014 ===
The Texans entered the 2014 season with a 14-game losing streak. Former Penn State head coach Bill O'Brien became the Texans' new head coach, and the third in franchise history, during the offseason. Starting off with journeyman quarterback Ryan Fitzpatrick, the Texans won three of their first four games, defeating the Redskins in the season opener, the Raiders, and the Bills, losing to the New York Giants. They lost three of their next four games, losing to the Dallas Cowboys, the Indianapolis Colts, and the Pittsburgh Steelers, respectively. The Texans went on to finish 9–7 in the 2014 season and barely missed the playoffs.

=== 2015 ===
In the 2015 season, they were featured on HBO, on the show "Hard Knocks". That year, the Texans started with a 2–5 record. Ryan Fitzpatrick was traded to the New York Jets and quarterback Ryan Mallett was released amidst controversy regarding his benching in favor of Brian Hoyer during a loss against the Indianapolis Colts. After a poor start, the Texans finished with a 9–7 record and won their third AFC South title. However, they were shut out by the Kansas City Chiefs in the wild-card round 30–0, ending their championship hopes for the year.

=== 2016 ===
On March 9, 2016, the Texans signed former Denver Broncos quarterback Brock Osweiler to a 4-year, $72 million deal. Despite Osweiler's lucrative deal, he struggled significantly during the entire season. After throwing two interceptions in Week 15 against the Jaguars, coach Bill O'Brien benched the offseason acquisition in favor of backup quarterback Tom Savage. Savage led a comeback effort against the Jaguars, and was named the starter for the remainder of the season. The Texans clinched their fourth AFC South division title in six years in Savage's first career start against the Bengals in Week 16. They defeated the wildcard Oakland Raiders 27–14 in the opening round of the playoffs with Osweiler as the starting quarterback due to Savage being out with a concussion. Osweiler started in the Divisional Playoffs game against the New England Patriots, throwing three interceptions in the second half. The Texans lost 34–16.

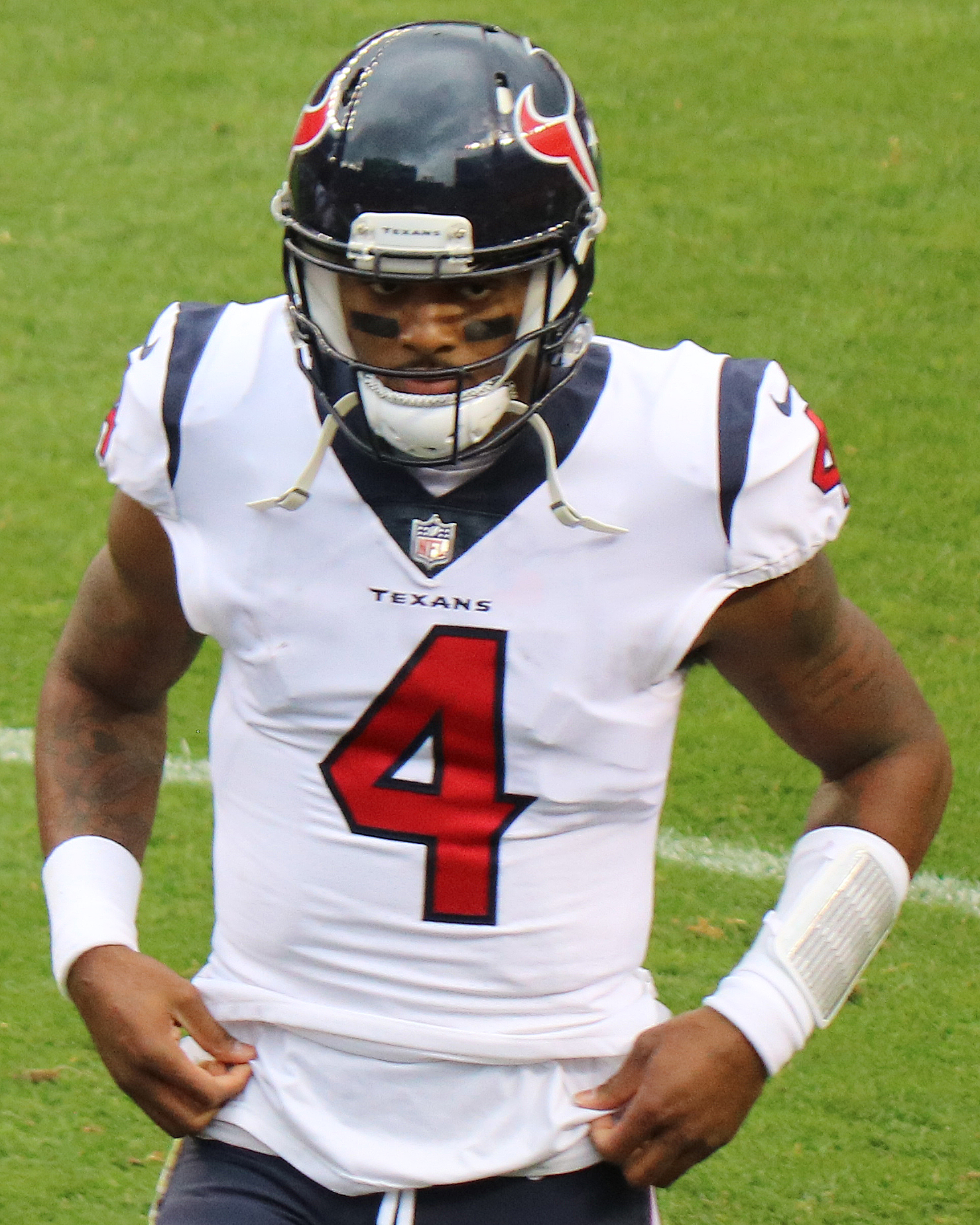
Quarterback Deshaun Watson in 2018

=== 2017 ===
Dissatisfied with Osweiler's play and burdened with his massive contract, the Texans eventually found a way to trade him, negotiating with the Cleveland Browns to deal him in what is now considered a "salary dump" trade due to Cleveland's vast cap space. They then drafted Clemson quarterback Deshaun Watson in the first round of the draft.

After poor play from Tom Savage in Week 1, Watson replaced him in the starting lineup and set numerous rookie passing records for the next few weeks. Unfortunately for the Texans, they lost Watson due to an ACL tear, and also lost J. J. Watt and other starters to season-ending injuries early in the year. After a 3–4 start that included an offensive shootout between Watson and Russell Wilson of the Seattle Seahawks, the Texans struggled after being forced to play Savage and T. J. Yates in Watson's stead, finishing with a 4–12 record.

=== 2018: Death of Bob McNair ===
Owner Bob McNair died during the season on November 23, 2018, passing ownership of the team to his wife Janice and son Cal. Despite an 0–3 start, the Texans won the next nine games in a row, culminating in an 11–5 record and an AFC South divisional title. However, they lost to the rival Indianapolis Colts in the wild-card round of the playoffs.

=== 2019 ===
Prior to the season, Houston abruptly fired general manager Brian Gaine after just over one year with the team. Houston also traded Jadeveon Clowney to the Seattle Seahawks, but added receiver Kenny Stills and offensive tackle Laremy Tunsil in another deal with the Miami Dolphins. The Texans won the division once again with a 10–6 record. Facing the Buffalo Bills in the wild-card round, they overcame a 16–0 third quarter deficit to win 22–19 in overtime thanks to some key plays by Deshaun Watson, but lost to the Kansas City Chiefs in the Divisional round 51–31 after squandering a 24–0 second quarter lead.

== Consistent coaching failures (2020–2022) ==
=== 2020 ===
The Texans started the 2020 off-season by making a blockbuster trade sending star wide receiver DeAndre Hopkins to the Arizona Cardinals. The Cardinals received Hopkins and a 2020 4th round draft pick from Houston, and Houston received running back David Johnson, a 2020 second round draft pick, and a 2021 fourth round draft pick.

Houston went on to find a replacement for Hopkins in the form of Rams wide receiver Brandin Cooks. They traded for the former Rams wide receiver sending a 2020 second round draft pick. In addition to receiving Cooks, the Texans also received a 2022 fourth round pick.

Following an 0–4 start to begin the 2020 NFL season, O'Brien was fired from the Texans. Romeo Crennel was named the interim head coach. They overall finished 4–12.

=== 2021 ===
After the 2020 season, the Texans hired David Culley to be their new head coach. It was also the end of an era as J.J. Watt was released on February 12, 2021, ending his 10-year tenure in Houston. He later signed with the Arizona Cardinals, reuniting him with former Texan DeAndre Hopkins. In addition, Deshaun Watson publicly demanded a trade, citing disagreement with the team's management and leading to a standoff. He would later be accused by several women of sexual assault, with 22 women filing lawsuits against him. Due to both factors, the Texans signed veteran journeyman Tyrod Taylor and drafted Davis Mills to play at quarterback in Watson's stead in 2021, ultimately keeping the latter inactive throughout the season despite not releasing or suspending him.

The Texans struggled again, finishing with a 4–13 record, though Mills showed promise when filling in at quarterback. Following the season, Culley was fired after just one season by Texans GM Nick Caserio due to "philosophical differences" in the team's direction, and Watson was traded to the Cleveland Browns after a grand jury declined to indict him on criminal charges related to his accusations.

=== 2022 ===
Soon after Culley's firing, coach Lovie Smith, who had previously had previous experience as the head coach of the Chicago Bears from 2004 to 2012 and as the head coach of the Tampa Bay Buccaneers from 2014 to 2016, was hired as the head coach for the Texans. In starting their first game of the season against the Indianapolis Colts, the Texans recorded their first tie in franchise history, tying 20–20 against the team. Despite the neutral start to the season, the Texans quickly fell to a losing season against the Broncos, and proceeded to have their worst start since the 2005 season. The team posted a 9-game losing streak from Week 7 to Week 15, their worst losing streak since 2013 Houston Texans season. They also failed to win a home game in 2022, going 0-7-1 at NRG Stadium.

The Texans were eliminated from playoff contention in Week 13, with a loss against the Cleveland Browns 14–27. Due to the unappealing 3-13-1 record posted by Lovie Smith, only hours after their season ending victory against the Colts, the Texans parted ways with him after only one season with the organization, making 2022 the third consecutive year that a head coach was fired during or after the season.

== DeMeco Ryans era and C. J. Stroud era begins (2023–present) ==
=== 2023 ===
After Smith's firing, on January 31, 2023, the Texans hired San Francisco 49ers defensive coordinator and former player DeMeco Ryans as their new head coach.

In the NFL draft, the Texans selected quarterback C. J. Stroud from Ohio State second overall. Stroud would break several NFL and franchise rookie records on his way to being named NFL Offensive Rookie of the Year, becoming the first player in franchise history to win the award. After trading with the Arizona Cardinals, the Texans would select Alabama defensive end Will Anderson Jr. third overall. Anderson was named the NFL Defensive Rookie of the Year, marking the fourth time in NFL history that teammates won the offensive and defensive rookie of the year awards.

While the team went into the season with low expectations as a rebuilding period and started 0–2, they not only improved on their 3–13–1 record from last year with a Week 9 win over the Tampa Bay Buccaneers, but the Texans qualified for the playoffs for the first time since 2019 with a win over the Indianapolis Colts in Week 18, ending with a 10–7 record. After the Jacksonville Jaguars lost to the Tennessee Titans the day after, the Texans also clinched the AFC South for the first time since 2019. The Texans became the fifth team in NFL history to make the playoffs with both a rookie quarterback and a rookie head coach, as well as making history as the first team in NFL history to win a division entirely with a rookie head coach and rookie quarterback.

In the Wild Card round of the playoffs, the Texans blew out the Cleveland Browns with a 45–14 win. The team's season would officially come to an end when they would lose to the one-seed Baltimore Ravens 34–10 in the Divisional round, preventing them from making their first AFC Championship appearance in franchise history.

=== 2024 ===
The Texans started 2–0 for the first time since 2016 following their Week 2 victory against the Chicago Bears on Sunday Night Football. The Texans would go on to have a 5–1 start, being their best start since 2012, but lost six of their next ten, including a game against the Detroit Lions where they blew a 23–7 halftime lead, and a loss to the Baltimore Ravens where they lost 31–2, only scoring a safety. Following a Week 15 victory against the Miami Dolphins coupled with the Indianapolis Colts losing to the Denver Broncos, the Texans successfully defended their AFC South title and ensured one home playoff game. After a Week 18 victory over the Tennessee Titans, the Texans finished with the same record as last season, 10–7.

Despite their inconsistent and mediocre regular season performance, the Texans defeated the Los Angeles Chargers 32–12 in the Wild Card Round to advance to the Divisional Round for the second consecutive season, where they lost to the AFC's top seed and two-time defending Super Bowl champion Kansas City Chiefs 23–14.
