= Kyle Isbel =

American baseball player (born 1997)

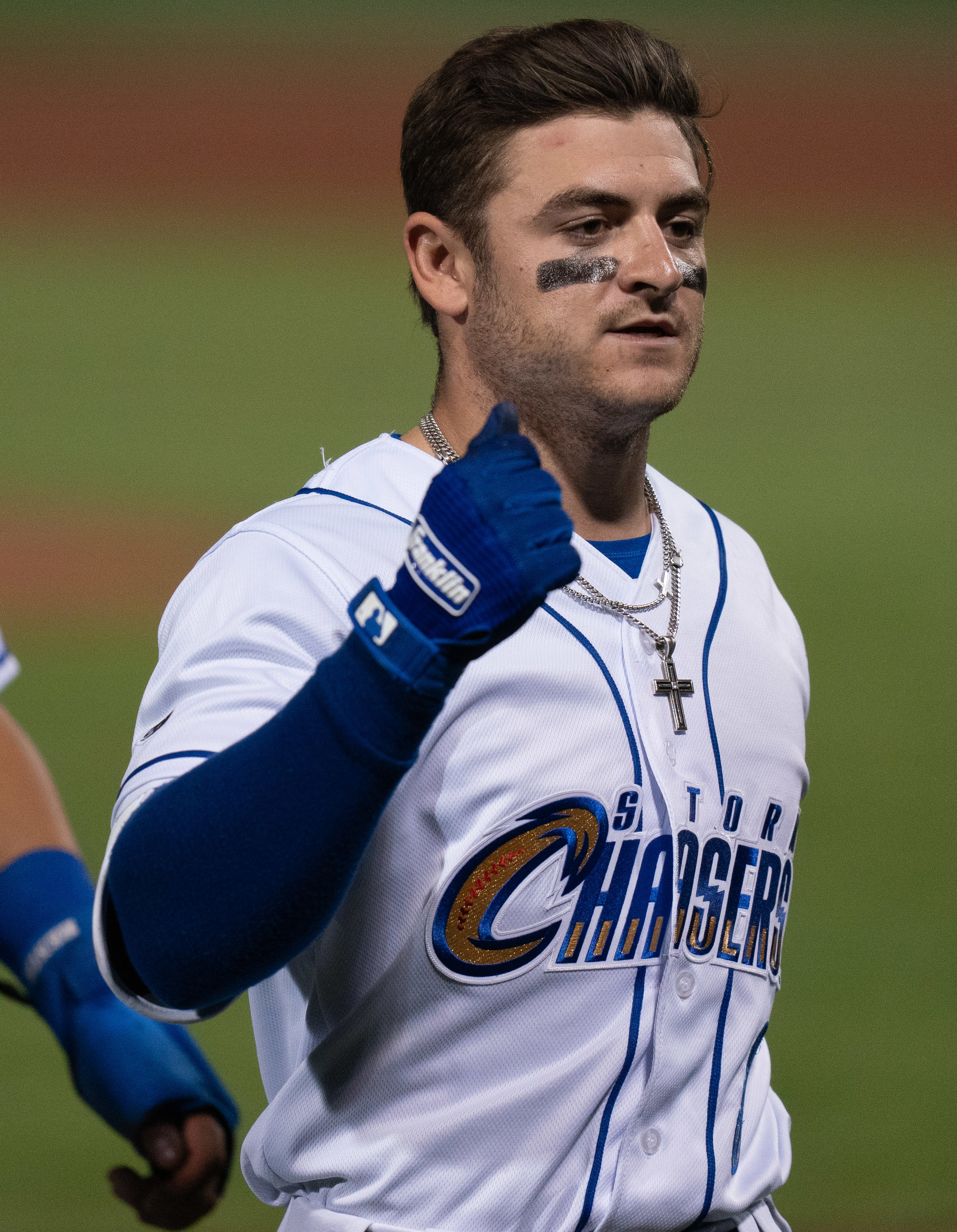
- Isbel with the Omaha Storm Chasers in 2021

Free agent
- Center fielder
- Born: March 3, 1997 (age 29); Fontana, California, U.S.
- Bats: Left Throws: Right

MLB debut
- April 1, 2021, for the Kansas City Royals

MLB statistics (through 2026 season)
- Batting average: .235
- Home runs: 29
- Runs batted in: 168
- Stats at Baseball Reference

Teams
- Kansas City Royals (2021–2026)

Kyle Grant Isbel (born March 3, 1997) is an American professional baseball center fielder who is a free agent. He has previously played in Major League Baseball (MLB) for the Kansas City Royals. He made his MLB debut in 2021.

== Amateur career ==
Isbel attended Etiwanda High School in Rancho Cucamonga, California, where he played baseball. As a junior, he hit .347. Following his junior year, he committed to play college baseball at the University of Nevada-Las Vegas (UNLV). Undrafted in the 2015 Major League Baseball draft, he enrolled at UNLV.

In 2016, Isbel's freshman season at UNLV, he hit .319 with one home run and 28 RBIs over 56 games, earning Mountain West Conference co-Freshman of the Year honors. That summer, he played in the California Collegiate League for the Santa Barbara Foresters. As a sophomore at UNLV in 2017, he played in 55 games, batting .290 with six home runs and 26 RBIs. Following the season, he played in the Cape Cod Baseball League with the Yarmouth–Dennis Red Sox, where he was named a league all-star. In 2018, his junior year, Isbel slashed .357/.441/.643 with 14 home runs and 56 RBIs over 59 games, earning All-MW First-Team honors.

== Professional career ==
=== Minor leagues ===
Isbel was selected by the Kansas City Royals in the third round (94th overall) of the 2018 Major League Baseball draft.

Isbel signed with the Royals and made his professional debut with the Idaho Falls Chukars before being promoted to the Lexington Legends. Over 64 games between the two clubs, Isbel hit .326 with seven home runs, 32 RBI, and 24 stolen bases. In 2019, he began the year with the Wilmington Blue Rocks. He was placed on the injured list in April, and was activated in July. He appeared in seven rehab games before being reassigned to Wilmington. Over 52 games with the Blue Rocks, Isbel hit .216 with five home runs and 23 RBI. He played in the Arizona Fall League for the Surprise Saguaros after the season, earning All-Star honors. Isbel did not play in a game in 2020 due to the cancellation of the minor league season because of the COVID-19 pandemic.

=== Major leagues ===
On March 31, 2021, Royals manager Mike Matheny announced the Isbel had made Kansas City's Opening Day roster and would be starting in right field. The next day, he was formally selected to the team's 40-man roster. Isbel made his MLB debut the same day, collecting his first MLB hit, an RBI single off of Kyle Gibson of the Texas Rangers; he finished the game going 3-for-5 with two RBI. He hit his first MLB home run on September 14, a two-run home run off Oakland Athletics pitcher Sergio Romo. In 2021, Isbel played in 76 games with the Royals and batted .276 with one home run and seven RBI.

On September 3, 2022, in a 12–2 win over the Detroit Tigers, Isbel hit his first career grand slam off of reliever Jason Foley. Isbel appeared in 106 games for the Royals and hit .211 with five home runs and 28 RBI. On May 4, 2023, Isbel exited a game against the Baltimore Orioles with a hamstring strain. The following day, he was diagnosed with a Grade 2 hamstring strain and ruled out for six weeks. He returned to play and appeared in 91 games for the Royals, batting .240 with five home runs and 34 RBI.

In 2024, Isbel played in 136 games for Kansas City and hit .229 with eight home runs and 42 RBI. In 2025, he appeared in 135 games and batted .255 with four home runs and 33 RBI.

On January 8, 2026, Isbel and the Royals agreed to a one-year contract worth $2.7 million to avoid salary arbitration. On June 11, Isbel was ruled out indefinitely after being diagnosed with a Grade 3 plantar fascia tear in his left foot. He was activated and returned to the Royals on August 2. Isbel made 100 total appearances for Kansas City during the regular season, slashing .224/.268/.323 with six home runs, 24 RBI, and six stolen bases. On November 18, Isbel was designated for assignment by the Royals. Two days later, he was non-tendered and became a free agent.
