= Heel pad syndrome =

- Other names: Heel fat pad syndrome, heel pad atrophy, heel fat pad atrophy
- Specialty: Podiatry

Heel pad syndrome is a pain that occurs in the center of the heel. There are many causes, but repeated pressure is the most common: risk factors include obesity. Conditions with similar symptoms include plantar fasciitis. Treatment includes rest, pain medication, and heel cups. It becomes more common with age.

== Signs and symptoms ==
- Pain in the heel, usually on the middle of the heel. This is in direct contrast to plantar fascia pain or heel spur pain which is present at the front of the heel, not the middle.
- Pain is usually a deep, dull ache that feels like a bruise.
- Pressing with the thumb into the centre of the heel should re-create the pain.
- Condition can often be attributed to a blow to the heel – landing hard while barefoot on a hard surface, jumping in dress shoes with a hard heel, stepping on a stone while running.
- Pain is aggravated by walking barefoot on hard surfaces like ceramic tile, concrete, hardwood floors, etc.

== Diagnosis ==
The main differential diagnosis of heel pad syndrome is plantar fasciitis. In heel pad syndrome all parts of the heel are tender while in plantar fasciitis typically only the part of the heel closer to the toes is sore. The pain of plantar fasciitis usually is medial heel and in the first steps in the morning. The pain in the heel pad is central, deeper, and exacerbates with long-term standings/walking on hard floors. Differentiation can be achieved with imaging (US/MRI): thickened plantar fascia is found in plantar fasciitis, whereas HPS demonstrates a decrease in the heel pad thickness.

== Treatment ==
Manual therapy and exercise have better efficacy in the long term than electrophysical agents and exercise for function, but not for pain. Manual therapy and exercise are preferably focused at stretching the plantar fascia.

Foot orthoses however do not appear to help with heel pain.
