= Heel =

Back of the foot

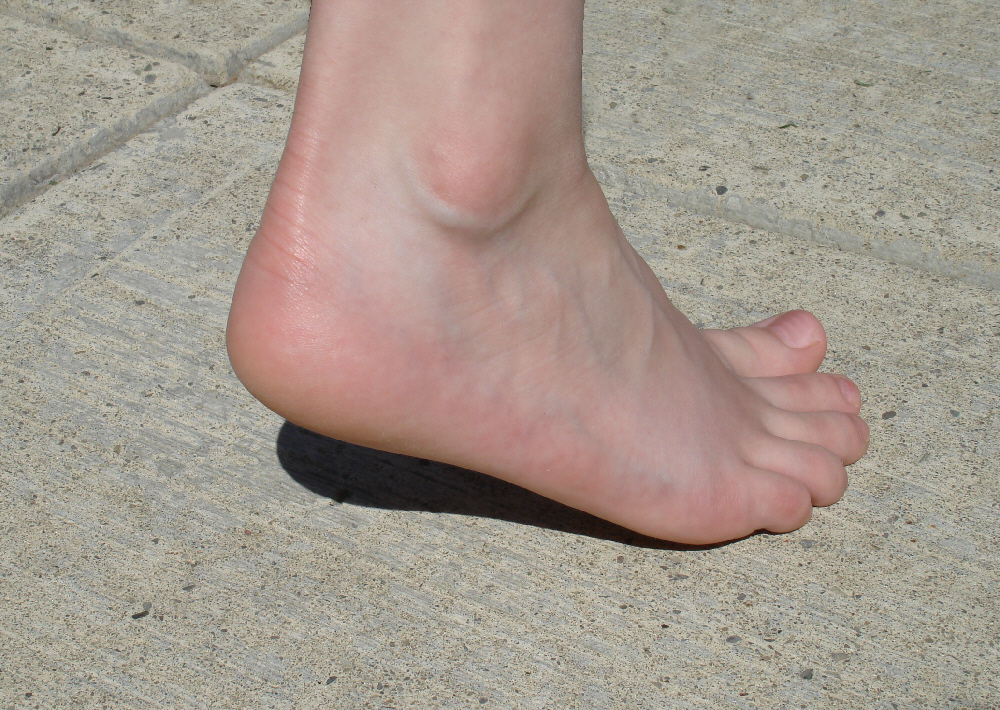
- A human heel

Details

Identifiers
- Latin: calx
- MeSH: D006365
- TA98: A01.1.00.042
- TA2: 167
- FMA: 24994

The heel is the prominence at the posterior end of the foot. It is based on the projection of one bone, the calcaneus or heel bone, behind the articulation of the bones of the lower leg.

== Structure ==
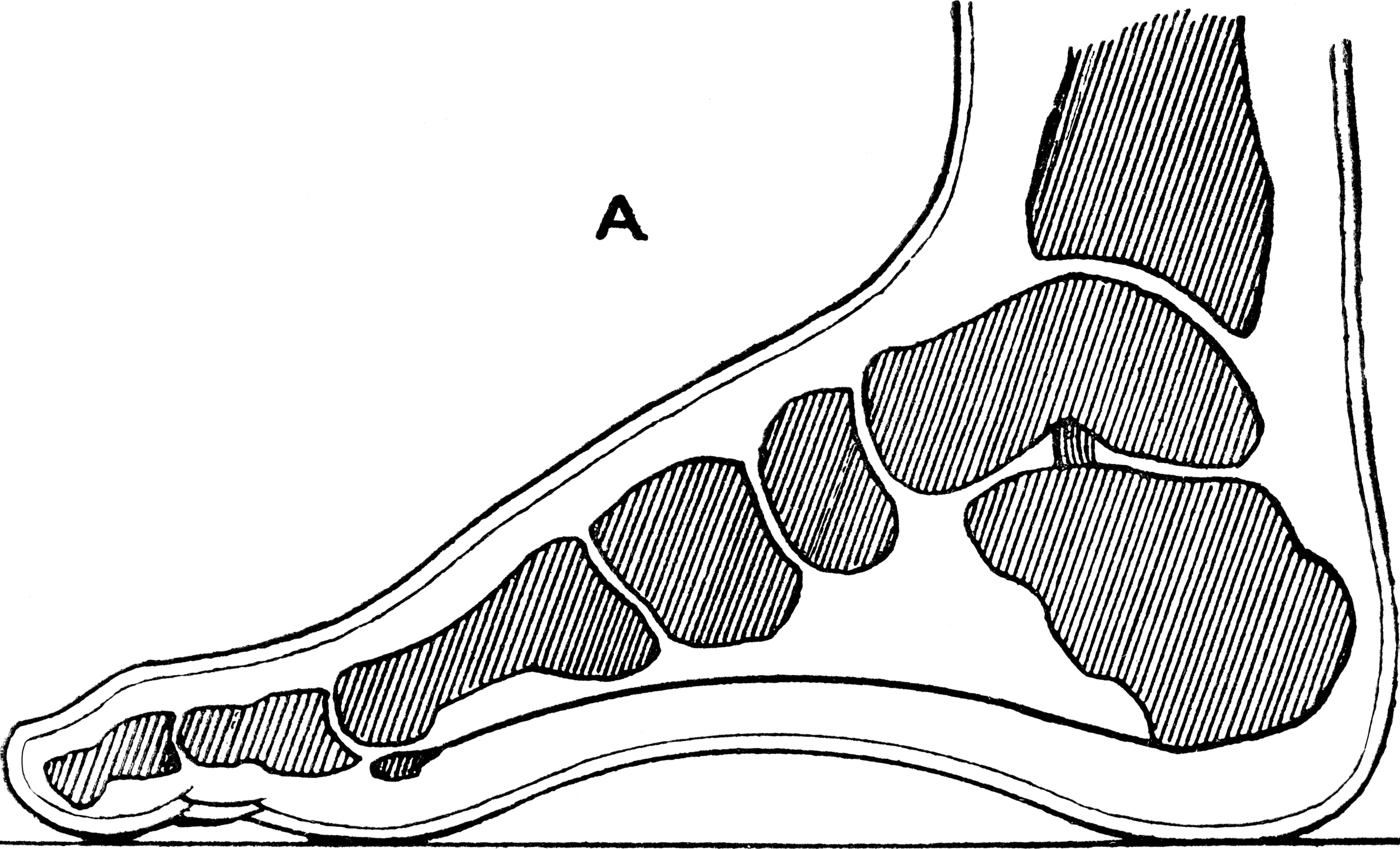
Sagittal section through the foot

From above

To distribute the compressive forces exerted on the heel during gait, and especially the stance phase when the heel contacts the ground, the sole of the foot is covered by a layer of subcutaneous connective tissue up to 2 cm thick (under the heel). This tissue has a system of pressure chambers that both acts as a shock absorber and stabilises the sole. Each of these chambers contains fibrofatty tissue covered by a layer of tough connective tissue made of collagen fibers. These septa ("walls") are firmly attached both to the plantar aponeurosis above and the sole's skin below. The sole of the foot is one of the most highly vascularized regions of the body surface, and the dense system of blood vessels further stabilize the septa.

The Achilles tendon is the muscle tendon of the triceps surae, a "three-headed" group of muscles—the soleus and the two heads of the gastrocnemius. The main function of the triceps surae is plantar flexion, i.e. to stretch the foot downward. It is accompanied by a "fourth head", the slight plantaris muscle, the long slender tendon of which is also attached to the heel bone but not visible.

== Function ==
The compressive forces applied to the foot are distributed along five rays, three medial (side of big toe) and two lateral (side of little toe). The lateral rays stretch over the cuboid bone to the heel bone and the medial rays over the three cuneiform bones and the navicular bone to the ankle bone. Because the ankle bone is placed over the heel bone, these rays are adjacent near the toes but overriding near the heel, and together they form the arches of the foot that are optimized to distributed compressive forces across an uneven terrain. In this context the heel thus forms the posterior point of support that together with the balls of the large and little toes bear the brunt of the loads.

== Cracked heels ==
Cracked heels is a common health problem and it may cause diseases and infections. It is caused by dryness of the foot skin, and accumulation of dead skin. Over time, it may cause pain and irritations. Various moisturising creams and foot files are available to cure and prevent it.

== Other animals ==
In the long-footed mammals, both the hoofed species (unguligrade) and the clawed forms which walk on the toes (digitigrade), the heel is well above the ground at the apex of the angular joint known as the hock. In plantigrade species, it rests on the ground. In birds, the heel is the backward-pointing joint which is often mistaken as the "knee" (the actual knee of birds is hidden under the plumage).

== See also ==
- Achilles' heel a metaphor for a weak point
- Heel of Italy, the southeast of Italy. after its position in the "boot"
- Ball of the foot
- Calcaneal spur heel-bone
- Callus Hard skin which may cause painful cracks in the heel and sole of the foot
- Plantar fasciitis
- High-heeled footwear fashion
- Squatting position
