= Plantar fascial rupture =

- Other names: Plantar fascial tear
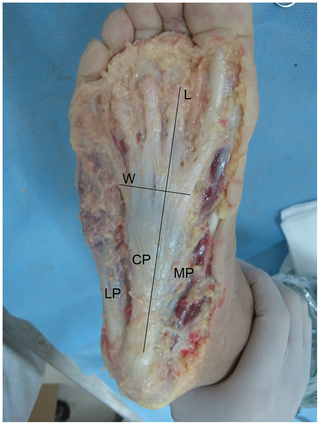
- Dissection of the plantar aponeurosis: LP, lateral part; CP, central part; MP, medial part; L, length; W, width.

A plantar fascial rupture is a painful tear in the plantar fascia. The plantar fascia is a connective tissue that spans across the bottom of the foot. The condition plantar fasciitis may increase the likelihood of rupture. A plantar fascial rupture may be mistaken for plantar fasciitis or even a calcaneal fracture. To allow for proper diagnosis, an MRI is often needed.

== Causes ==
The risk for the development of plantar fascia tears can be increased by certain factors which could include:

1. Overweight
2. Non- Supportive footwear
3. Flat arched feet
4. High arched feet
5. A sudden increase in activity/Overuse
6. Hormone problems
7. Lack of flexibility of the calf, Achilles tendon and the plantar fascia.
8. Connective tissue disorders such as rheumatoid arthritis.

== Types ==
=== Complete ===
Complete tears of the plantar fascia are often due to sudden trauma or injury. Often, the rupture will be accompanied by a popping sound and painful snapping sensation. The bottom of the foot often bruises and swells. Former NFL athlete Peyton Manning suffered a complete rupture in 2015.

The surgical procedure known as a plantar fascia release actually involves the purposeful infliction of a complete tear of the plantar fascia. This is intended to relieve plantar fasciitis symptoms when the tissue recovers by building more tissue, elongating the previously tight plantar fascia.

=== Partial ===
Partial tears are seemingly even less common than complete tears. They are more likely to arise from overuse from activities like daily running. The bottom of the foot may be swollen or bruised.

== Treatment ==
Full recovery from both complete and partial tears typically takes 12 weeks or more. However, activities may gradually resume after 6–8 weeks when the plantar fascia will be mostly recovered. Surgery is typically a last resort. At home, it might be advisable to follow the RICE method to reduce inflammation and ease pain.

=== Immobilization ===
For the first 2–4 weeks after diagnosis, patients are often instructed to use a walking boot to immobilize and protect the foot.

=== Physical therapy ===
During the immobilization period, it is important to keep the foot flexible by lightly stretching the foot and calf regularly.

As the plantar fascia recovers, physical therapy exercises help stabilize the ankle and correct gait patterns that may have contributed to the tear. Stretching and strengthening exercises decrease the chance of reinjury.

=== Other treatments ===
Platelet-Rich Plasma injections may be used to help accelerate recovery and decrease the chance of reinjury.

Cortisone injections may ease pain.
