= Billy Miller (American football) =

American football player (born 1977)

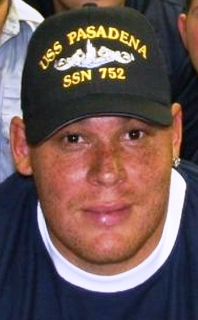
- Miller on USS Pasadena in 2008

No. 82, 84, 83
- Position: Tight end

Personal information
- Born: April 24, 1977 (age 49); Los Angeles, California, U.S.
- Listed height: 6 ft 3 in (1.91 m)
- Listed weight: 253 lb (115 kg)

Career information
- High school: Westlake(Thousand Oaks, California)
- College: USC (1995-1998)
- NFL draft: 1999: 7th round, 218th overall pick

Career history
- Denver Broncos (1999–2000); Houston Texans (2002–2004); Cleveland Browns (2005); New Orleans Saints (2006–2009)

Awards and highlights
- Super Bowl champion (XLIV)

Career NFL statistics
- Receptions: 200
- Receiving yards: 2,248
- Receiving touchdowns: 10
- Stats at Pro Football Reference

Billy RoShawn Miller (born April 24, 1977) is an American former professional football player who was a tight end in the National Football League (NFL). He won a Super Bowl with the New Orleans Saints. He was selected by the Denver Broncos in the seventh round of the 1999 NFL draft. He played college football for the USC Trojans and wore no. 3.

Miller has also played for the Houston Texans, for whom he scored the first touchdown in the Texans' history, and the Cleveland Browns in his career.

== Early life ==
Billy attended Westlake High School in Westlake Village, California from 1991 to 1995. He was the consensus prep All-America selection at Westlake High School. Miller hauled in 69 passes for 1,087 yards and 14 TDs as a senior, also two-year starter on Westlake's basketball team, earning all-Marmonte league and all-Ventura County honors.

He was the national Top 100 pick by the Dallas Morning News, posting 187 career receptions for 3,017 yards and 34 scores.

== Professional career ==
After playing for the Denver Broncos with no starts and no playing time in 2001, Miller signed to the Houston Texans in 2002. Miller became a relatively integral part of the Texans' offense, starting in 21 games in 3 years, and playing in every game. In his first year, he obtained over 600 receiving yards, while scoring 3 touchdowns. He scored the first touchdown for the Texans franchise.

Miller was waived by the Saints on September 10, 2008, but re-signed on September 16. He had 45 receptions for 579 yards for 2008–2009. But before the 2009 season started, Miller tore his Achilles tendon in an exhibition game against the Miami Dolphins, ending his football playing career. The Saints won the Super Bowl the following February.
