= Calcaneal spur =

Medical condition of the heel

- Other names: Heel spur
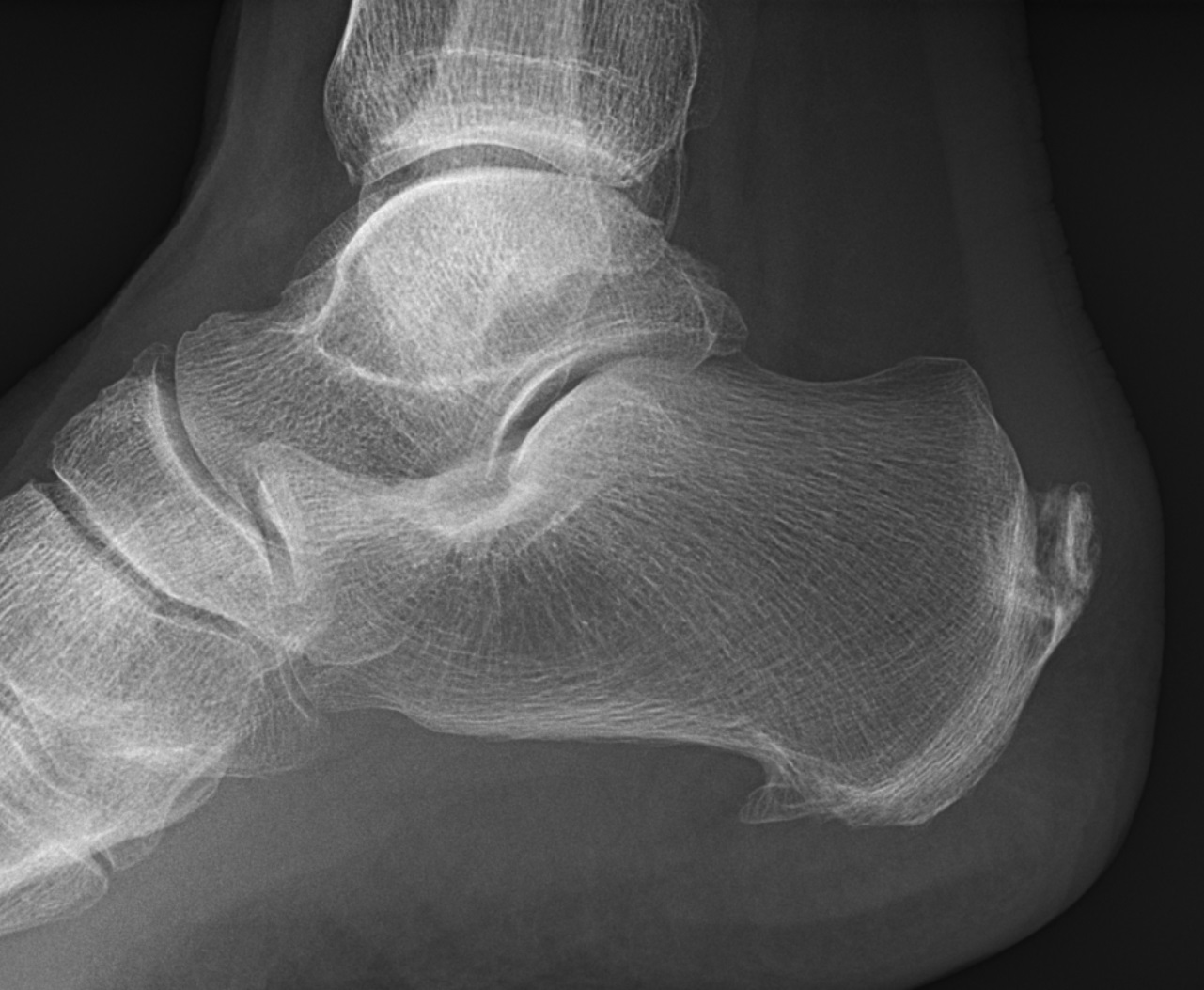
- A radiograph showing osteophytes on the posterior and inferior aspects of the calcaneus
- Specialty: Rheumatology

A calcaneal spur (also known as a heel spur) is a bony outgrowth from the calcaneal tuberosity (heel bone). Calcaneal spurs are typically detected by x-ray examination. It is a form of exostosis.

When a foot is exposed to constant stress, calcium deposits build up on the bottom of the heel bone. Generally, this has no effect on a person's daily life. However, repeated damage can cause these deposits to pile up on each other, causing a spur-shaped deformity, called a calcaneal (or heel) spur.

An inferior calcaneal spur is located on the inferior aspect of the calcaneus and is typically a response to plantar fasciitis over a period, but may also be associated with ankylosing spondylitis (typically in children). A posterior calcaneal spur develops on the back of the heel at the insertion of the Achilles tendon.

An inferior calcaneal spur consists of a calcification of the calcaneus, which lies superior to the plantar fascia at the insertion of the plantar fascia. A posterior calcaneal spur is often large and palpable through the skin and may need to be removed as part of the treatment of insertional Achilles tendonitis.

== Signs and symptoms ==
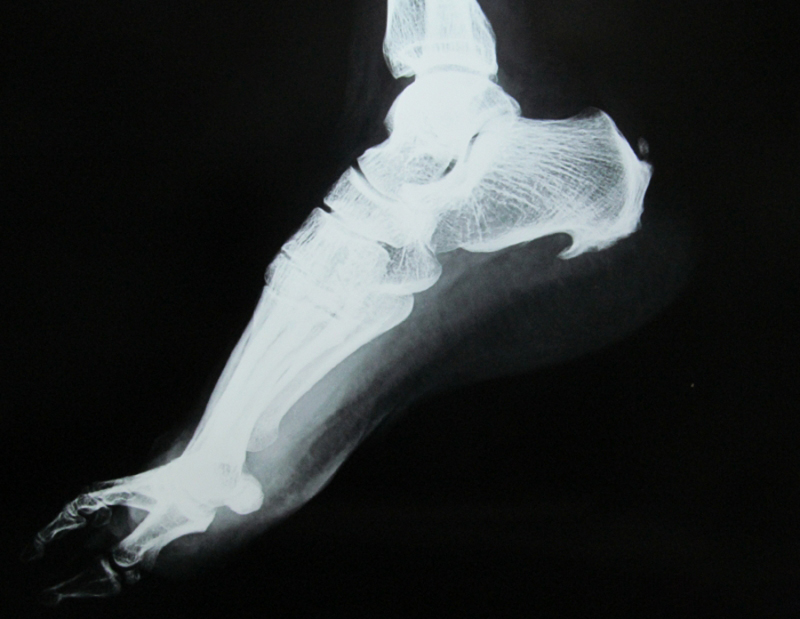
Inferior calcaneal spur

Major symptoms consist of pain in the region surrounding the spur, which typically increases in intensity after prolonged periods of rest. Patients may report heel pain to be more severe when waking up in the morning. Patients may not be able to bear weight on the affected heel comfortably. Running, walking, or lifting heavy weight may exacerbate the issue.

== Causes ==
Plantar fasciitis is a common cause of calcaneal spurs. When stress is put on the plantar fascia ligament, it does not cause only plantar fasciitis, but causes a heel spur where the plantar fascia attaches to the heel bone. The considerations that affect plantar heel pain are the alignment of the foot with lower leg, foot and ankle mobility, strength and endurance of muscle. External influences on plantar heel pain are the amount of time spent on feet while exercising or standing, type of footwear used and type of floor surfaces.

Calcaneal spur develops when proper care is not given to the foot and heels. People who are obese, have flat feet, or who often wear high-heeled shoes are most susceptible to heel spurs. Flat feet can potentially be attributed to the minimal amount of ankle dorsiflexion during stance phase of the gait cycle causing more tension on the plantar fascia.

== Diagnosis ==
X-rays are usually used to diagnose calcaneal spurs.

== Treatment ==
It is often seen as a repetitive stress injury, and thus lifestyle modification is typically the basic course of management strategies. For example, a person should begin doing foot and calf workouts. Strong muscles in the calves and lower legs will help take the stress off the bone and prevent heel spurs. Icing the area is an effective way to get immediate pain relief. There are several means to get pain relief from plantar heel pain. Plantar heel pain can be a precursor to many pathologies of the foot. There is evidence that corticosteroid injections may reduce pain for up to one month after the injection, which can have an impact on the formation of calcaneal spurs. Side effects of corticosteroid injections include peripheral nerve injury, plantar fascia rupture, and post injection flare, among others. Laser therapy, dry needling, and calcaneal taping are also utilized in treating plantar heel pain, however, there is no high quality evidence supporting the clinical usage of such modalities in reduction of pain.

== Prognosis ==
According to studies following patients with plantar fasciitis and calcaneal spur over several years, 20% to 75% of individuals no longer have any symptoms within a maximum of one year after the onset of symptoms.
