= Plantar fascia =

Aponeurosis of the sole of the foot

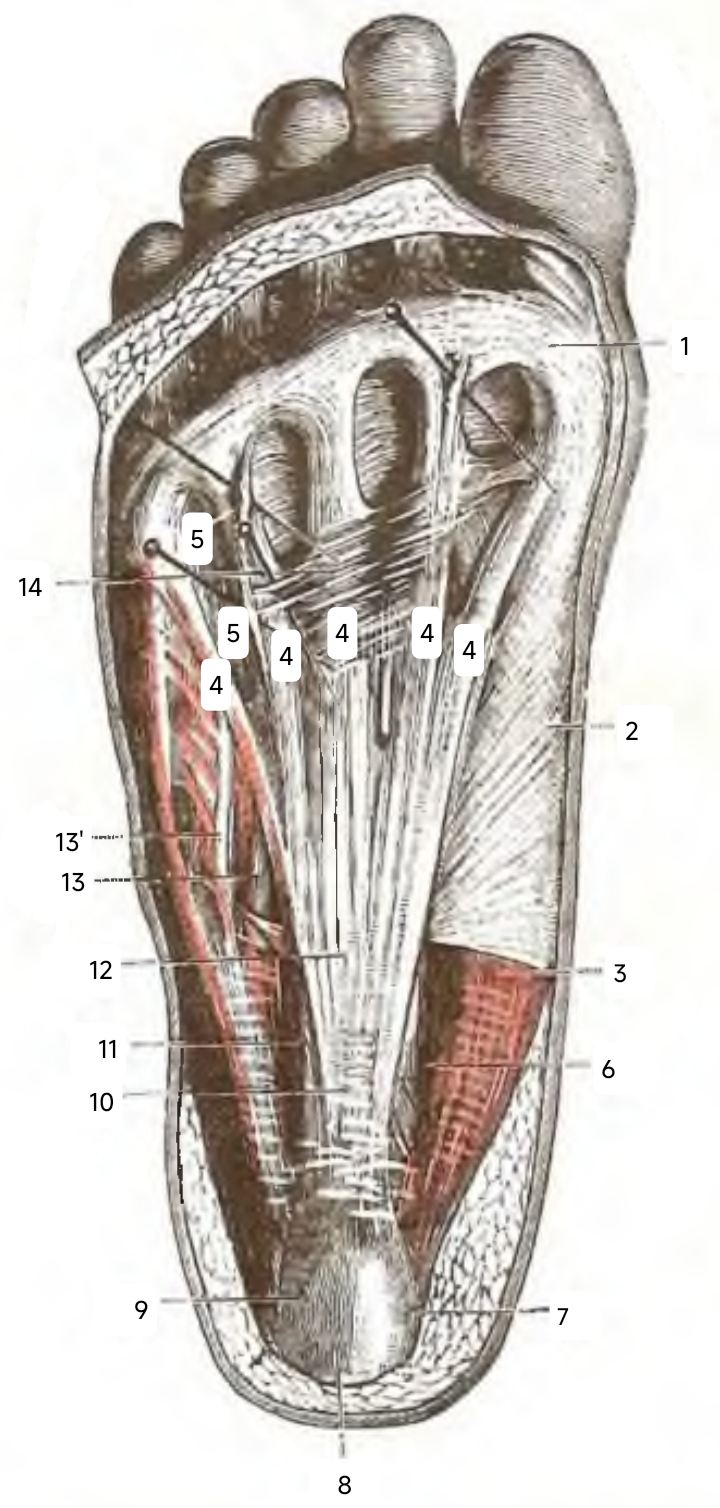
- Dissected sole of the right foot. Plantar fascia layer is closest to the skin on the sole of the foot. (From Testut's Anatomy.)

Details

Identifiers
- Latin: aponeurosis plantaris
- TA98: A04.7.03.031
- TA2: 2718
- FMA: 45171

The plantar fascia or plantar aponeurosis is the thick connective tissue aponeurosis which supports the arch on the bottom (plantar side) of the foot. Recent studies suggest that the plantar fascia is actually an aponeurosis rather than true fascia.‍ It runs from the tuberosity of the calcaneus (heel bone) forward to the heads of the metatarsal bones (the bone between each toe and the bones of the mid-foot).

== Anatomy ==
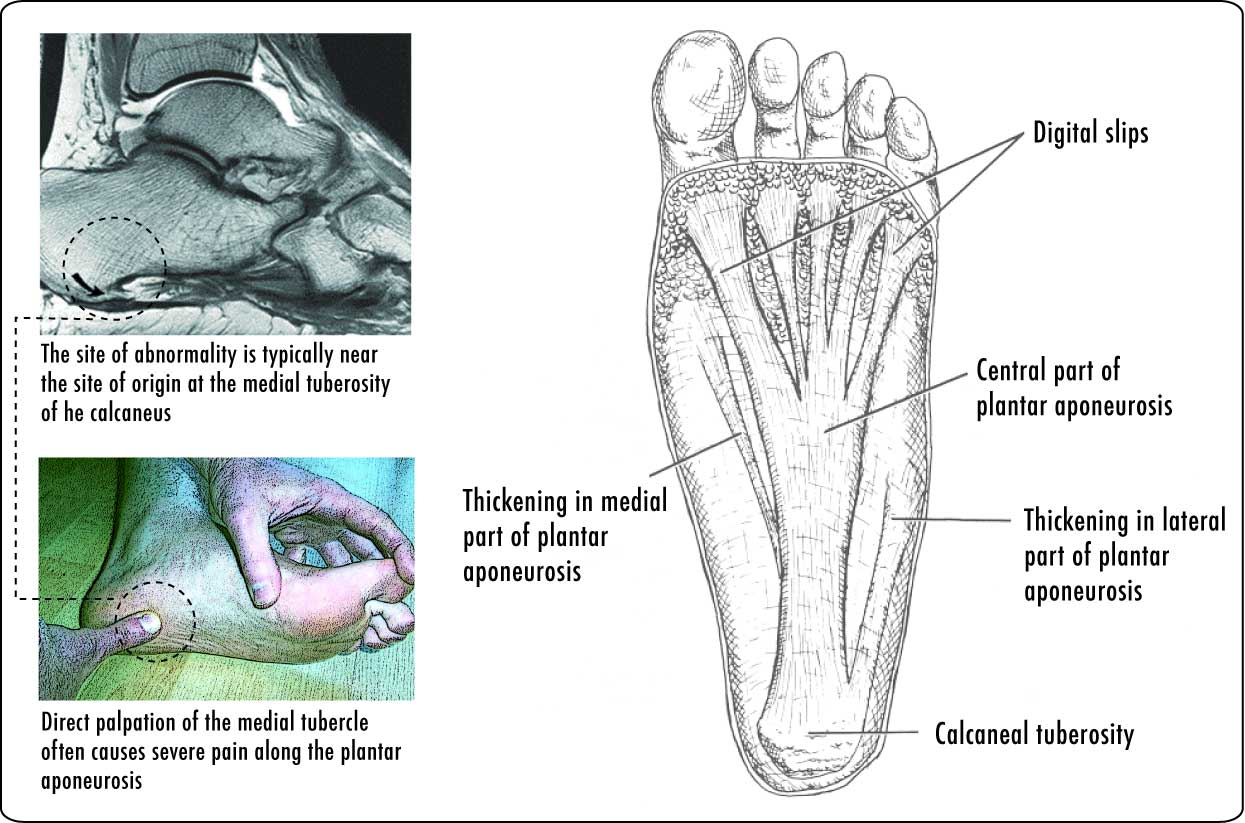
Anatomical diagrams illustrating the components of the plantar fascia.

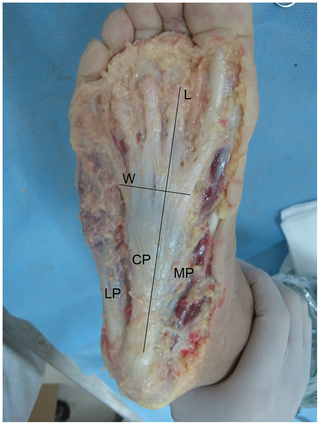
Dissection of the plantar aponeurosis: LP, lateral part; CP, central part; MP, medial part; L, length; W, width.

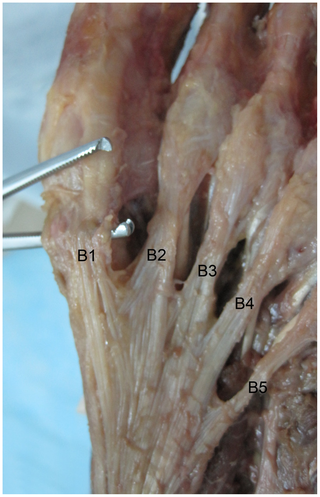
Five central part plantar aponeurosis bundles.

The plantar fascia is the thick central portion of the fascia investing the plantar muscles. It extends between the medial process of the tuber calcanei and the proximal phalanges of the toes. It provides some attachment to the flexor muscles of the toes.‍

Distally, the plantar fascia becomes continuous with the fibrous sheaths enveloping the flexor tendons passing to the toes. At the anterior extremity of the sole – inferior to the heads of the metatarsal bones – the plantar aponeurosis forms the superficial transverse metatarsal ligament.‍

=== Structure ===
The plantar fascia is made up of predominantly longitudinally oriented collagen fibers. There are three distinct structural components: the medial component, the central component (plantar aponeurosis), and the lateral component (see diagram at right). The central component is the largest and most prominent.

=== Development ===
In younger people the plantar fascia is also intimately related to the Achilles tendon, with a continuous fascial connection between the two from the distal aspect of the Achilles to the origin of the plantar fascia at the calcaneal tubercle. However, the continuity of this connection decreases with age to a point that in the elderly there are few, if any, connecting fibers. There are also distinct attachments of the plantar fascia and the Achilles tendon to the calcaneus so the two do not directly contact each other. Nevertheless, there is an indirect relationship whereby if the toes are dorsiflexed, the plantar fascia tightens via the windlass mechanism. If a tensile force is then generated in the Achilles tendon it will increase tensile strain in the plantar fascia. Clinically, this relationship has been used as a basis for treatment for plantar fasciitis, with stretches and night stretch splinting being applied to the gastrocnemius/soleus muscle unit.

== Function ==
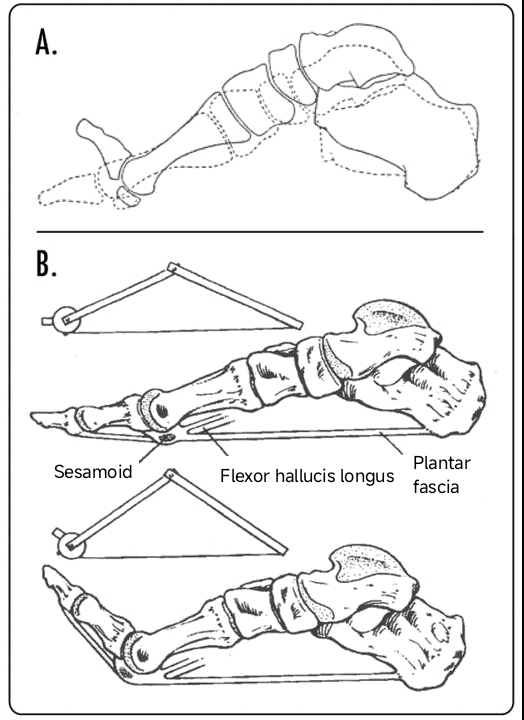
The effect of dorsiflexing the toes on arch height (A). The windlass mechanism (B).

The plantar fascia contributes to support of the arch of the foot by acting as a tie-rod, where it undergoes tension when the foot bears weight. One biomechanical model estimated it carries as much as 14% of the total load of the foot. In an experiment using cadavers, it was found that failure of the plantar fascia averaged at loads of 118±244 newtons (12 ± 25 kilograms-force; 27 ± 55 pounds-force). Failure most often occurred at the proximal attachment to the calcaneus, which is consistent with the usual location of symptoms (i.e., in plantar fasciitis). Complete rupture or surgical release of the plantar fascia leads to a decrease in arch stiffness and a significant collapse of the longitudinal arch of the foot. By modeling it was predicted such conditions would result in a 17% increase in vertical displacement and a 15% increase in horizontal elongation of the foot when it was loaded at 683 newtons (70 kgf; 154 lbf).‍ Surgical release also significantly increases both stress in the plantar ligaments and plantar pressures under the metatarsal heads. Although most of the figures mentioned above are from either cadaver studies or investigations using models, they highlight the relatively large load the plantar fascia is subjected to while contributing to the structural integrity of the foot.

=== Gait ===
The plantar fascia also has an important role in dynamic function during gait. It was found the plantar fascia continuously elongated during the contact phase of gait. It went through rapid elongation before and immediately after mid-stance, reaching a maximum of 9% to 12% elongation between mid-stance and toe-off.‍ During this phase the plantar fascia behaves like a spring, which may assist in conserving energy. In addition, the plantar fascia has a critical role in normal mechanical function of the foot, contributing to the "windlass mechanism". When the toes are dorsiflexed in the propulsive phase of gait, the plantar fascia becomes tense, resulting in elevation of the longitudinal arch and shortening of the foot (see 3A). One can liken this mechanism to a cable being wound around the drum of a windlass (see 3B); the plantar fascia being the cable, the metatarsal head the drum, and the handle, the proximal phalanx.

== Clinical significance ==
=== Plantar fasciitis ===
- Plantar fasciitis is an often painful degenerative process of the plantar fascia.
  - Calcaneal spur (heel spur) is a small calcified bone extension (osteophyte) located on the inferior aspect of the calcaneus or on the back of the heel at the insertion of the Achilles tendon. The condition is typically a response to plantar fasciitis over a period of time. Visualized on x-ray. It is mistaken for a sharp piece or horn of bone sticking out of the heel and instead is actually calcification of the plantar fascia, mistakenly thought to be a bone spur. It may also be related to ankylosing spondylitis, typically in children.

=== Other ===
- Plantar fibromatosis is a relatively uncommon non-malignant thickening of the plantar fascia.
- Psoriatic arthritis is a type of inflammatory arthritis that may affect the plantar fascia.
- Plantar fascial rupture/tear is a relatively uncommon painful tearing of the plantar fascia. The tear can be full or partial.

== Additional images ==
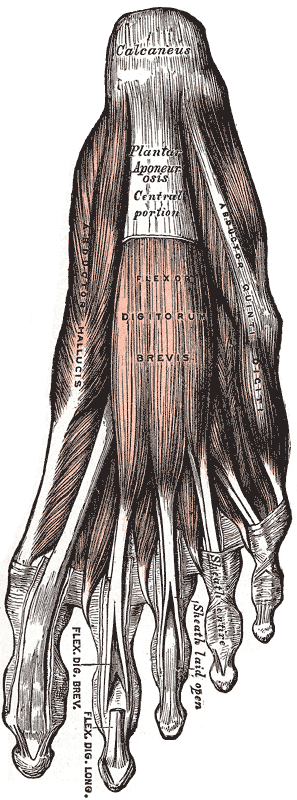
The plantar fascia (also known as the plantar aponeurosis) is located superficially plantar side of the foot.
