= Plantar fasciitis =

Connective tissue disorder of the heel

- Other names: Plantar fasciosis, plantar fasciopathy, jogger's heel, heel spur syndrome
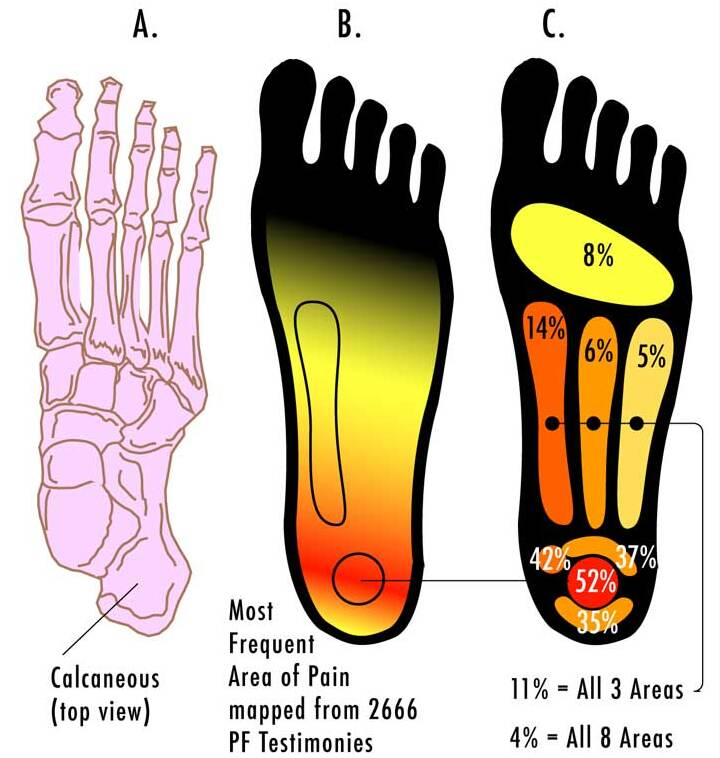
- Most common areas of pain in plantar fasciitis
- Specialty: Orthopedics, sports medicine, plastic surgery, podiatry
- Symptoms: Pain in the heel and bottom of the foot
- Usual onset: Gradual
- Causes: Unclear
- Risk factors: Overuse (long periods of standing), obesity, inward rolling of the foot
- Diagnostic method: Based on symptoms, ultrasound
- Differential diagnosis: Osteoarthritis, ankylosing spondylitis, heel pad syndrome, reactive arthritis
- Treatment: Conservative management
- Frequency: ~4%

Plantar fasciitis or plantar heel pain is a disorder of the plantar fascia, which is the connective tissue that supports the arch of the foot. It results in pain in the heel and bottom of the foot that is usually most severe with the first steps of the day or following a period of rest. Pain is also frequently brought on by bending the foot and toes up towards the shin. The pain typically comes on gradually. It affects both feet in about one-third of cases.

The cause of plantar fasciitis is not clear. Risk factors include overuse, such as from long periods of standing, an increase in exercise, and obesity. It is associated with inward rolling of the foot, a tight calf muscle and Achilles tendon, and a sedentary lifestyle. Heel spurs may play a role; they are commonly present in people who have the condition. Plantar fasciitis is a disorder of the insertion site of the ligament on the bone characterized by micro tears, collagen breakdown, and scarring. Inflammation plays either a lesser or no role. A review proposed that the disorder be renamed plantar fasciosis. Presentation of symptoms is generally the basis for diagnosis. Conditions with similar symptoms include osteoarthritis, ankylosing spondylitis, heel pad syndrome, and reactive arthritis. Ultrasound can be useful in cases where the symptoms do not imply a diagnosis.

Most cases resolve with time and conservative treatment. For the first few weeks, treatment involves rest, reduced activities, pain medications, and stretching. The next level involves physiotherapy, orthotics, splinting, or steroid injections. Additional measures may include extracorporeal shockwave therapy or surgery.

Between 4% and 7% of people have heel pain at any given time: about 80% are due to plantar fasciitis. Approximately 10% have the disorder at some point. It becomes more common with age. It is unclear whether one sex is more affected than the other.

== Signs and symptoms ==
When plantar fasciitis occurs, pain is typically sharp and usually unilateral (70% of cases). Bearing weight on the heel after long periods of rest worsens pain. Individuals often report that symptoms are most intense during their first steps after getting out of bed or after prolonged sitting. Symptoms typically improve with walking. Rarer symptoms include numbness, tingling, swelling, and radiating pain. Typically fevers and night sweats are not present.

If the plantar fascia is overused, the fascia can rupture. Typical rupture signs and symptoms include a clicking or snapping sound, significant local swelling, and acute pain on the bottom of the foot.

== Risk factors ==
Identified risk factors for plantar fasciitis include excessive running, prolonged standing on hard surfaces, high arches, leg length inequality, and flat feet. The tendency of flat feet to excessively roll inward, or supinate, during walking or running makes them more susceptible. Obesity is seen in 70% of individuals who present with plantar fasciitis and is an independent risk factor.

Plantar fasciitis is commonly a result of some biomechanical imbalance that causes increased tension along the fascia.

Achilles tendon tightness and inappropriate footwear are significant risk factors.

== Pathophysiology ==
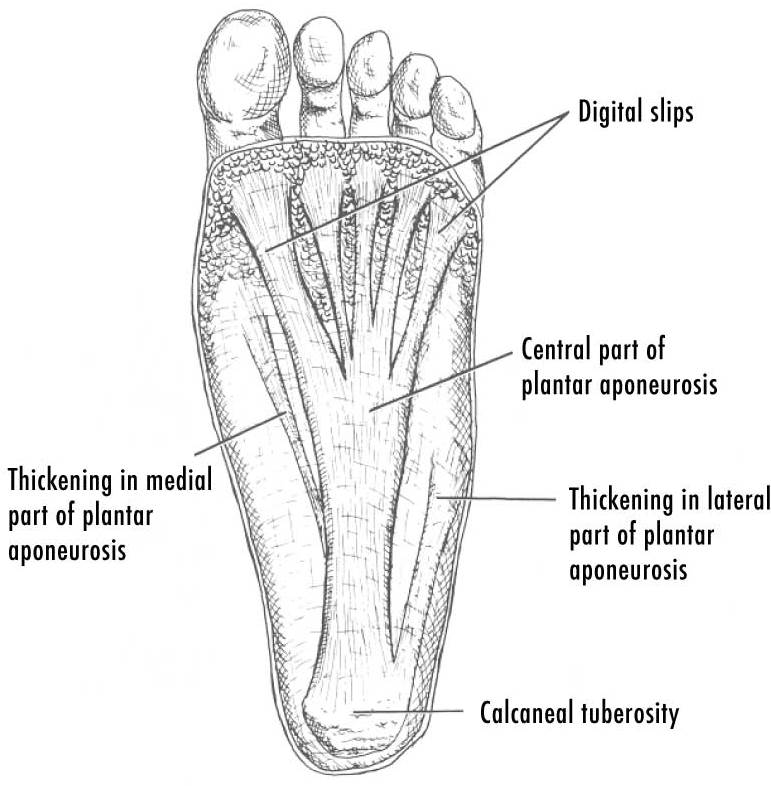
Drawing of the plantar fascia

The plantar fascia is a thick fibrous band of connective tissue that originates from the medial tubercle and anterior aspect of the heel bone. From there, the fascia extends along the sole before inserting at the base of the toes and supports the arch.

Plantar fasciitis is a non-inflammatory condition. Studies reported microscopic anatomical changes indicating that plantar fasciitis is due to a non-inflammatory structural breakdown of the plantar fascia, leading to calls to rename the condition.

Repetitive microtrauma (small tears) appears to cause a structural breakdown of the plantar fascia. Microscopic examination shows myxomatous degeneration, connective tissue calcium deposits, and disorganized collagen fibers.

Disruptions in normal mechanical movement during standing and walking (known as the Windlass mechanism) place excess strain on the calcaneal tuberosity and may contribute to symptom development. Other studies have suggested that plantar fasciitis may be a tendon injury involving the flexor digitorum brevis muscle located immediately above the plantar fascia.

== Diagnosis ==
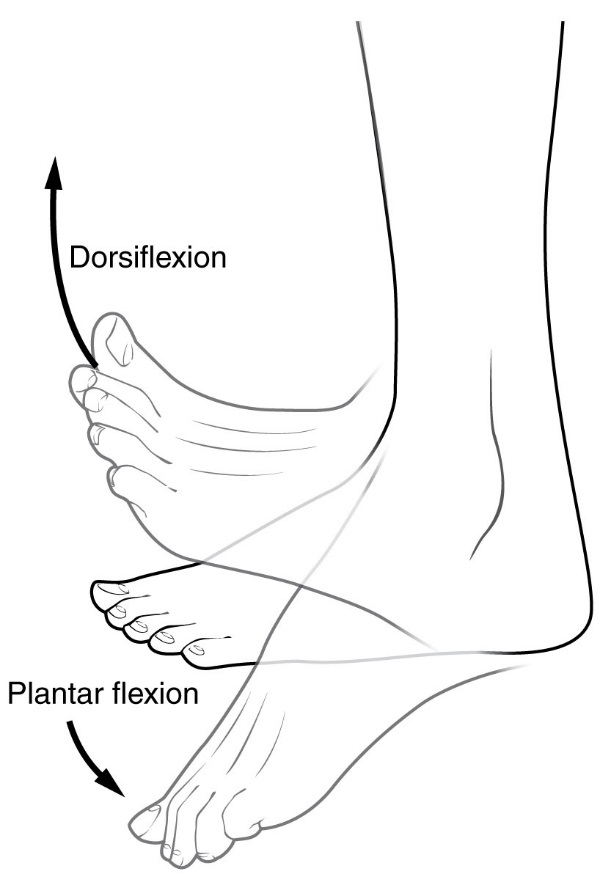
Achilles tendon tightness is a risk factor for plantar fasciitis. It can lead to decreased dorsiflexion of the foot.

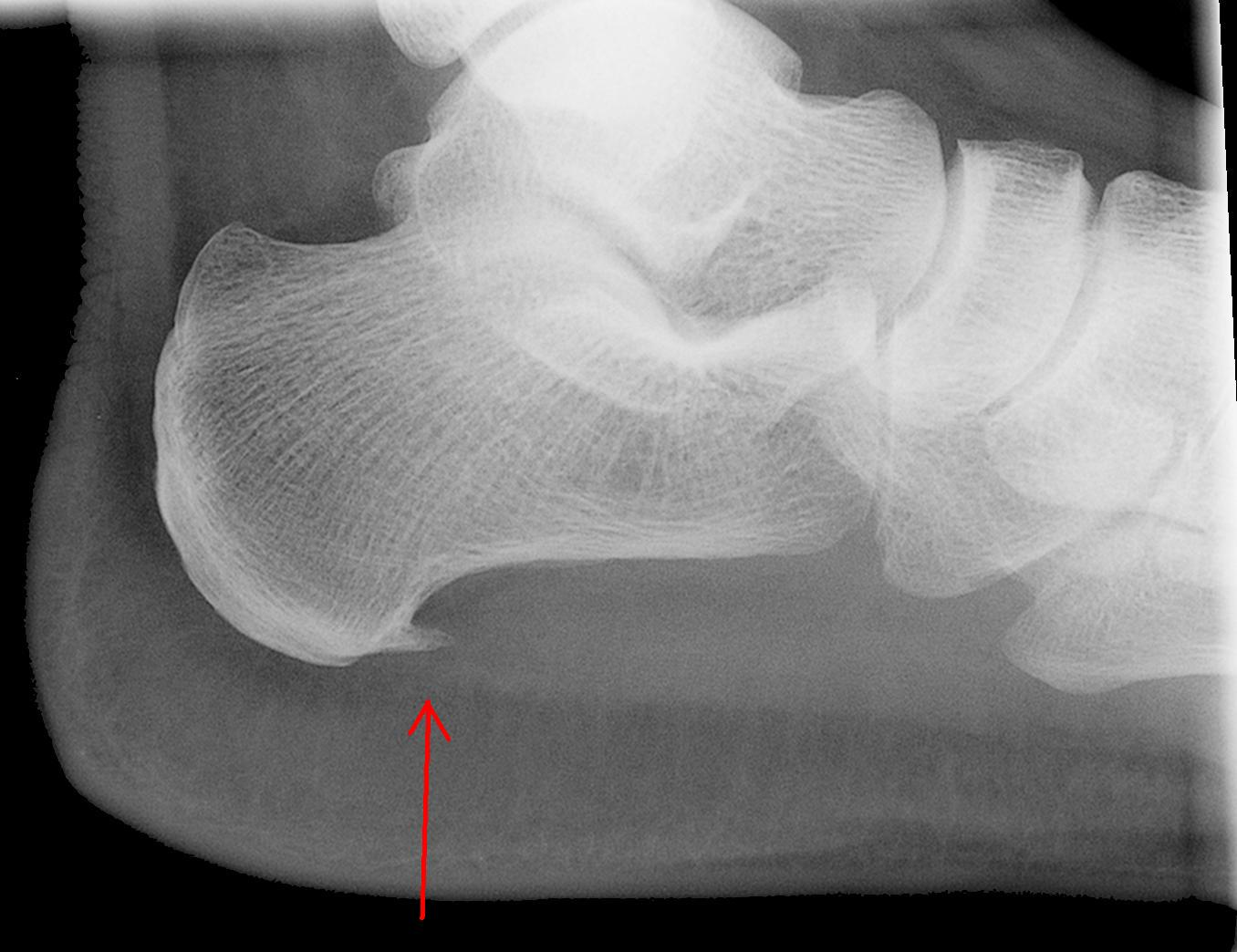
Heel bone with heel spur (red arrow)

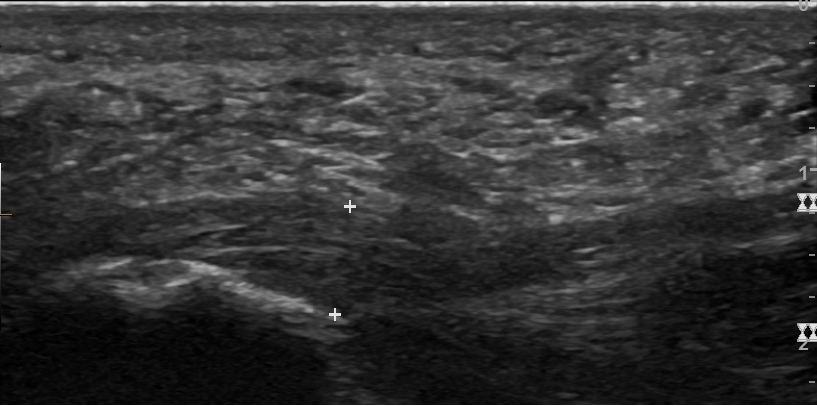
Thickened plantar fascia in ultrasound

Plantar fasciitis is usually diagnosed by a healthcare provider based on a history, risk factors, and clinical examination. Palpation along the inner aspect of the heel bone on the sole may elicit tenderness during an examination. The foot may have limited dorsiflexion due to tightness of the calf muscles or the Achilles tendon. Dorsiflexion may elicit pain. Diagnostic imaging is not usually indicated. Occasionally, a physician may decide imaging studies (such as X-rays, diagnostic ultrasound, or MRI) are warranted to rule out other diagnoses.

Other possible diagnoses include fractures, tumors, or systemic disease should pain not respond to conservative medical treatments. Bilateral heel pain or heel pain in the context of a systemic illness may indicate further diagnosis. Under these circumstances, tests such as a CBC or serological markers of inflammation, infection, or autoimmune disease such as C-reactive protein, erythrocyte sedimentation rate, anti-nuclear antibodies, rheumatoid factor, HLA-B27, uric acid, or Lyme disease antibodies may be conducted. Neurological deficits may prompt an investigation with electromyography to check for nerve or muscle damage.

An incidental finding associated with this condition is a heel spur, a small bony calcification on the calcaneus (heel bone), which can be found in up to 50% of patients. In such cases, the plantar fasciitis produces the heel pain, rather than the spur. The condition creates the spur, though the clinical significance of heel spurs remains unclear.

=== Imaging ===
Imaging is not routinely indicated. It typically does not change plantar fasciitis management. When the diagnosis is not clinically apparent, lateral view X-rays of the ankle are the standard imaging modality to consider other causes, such as stress fractures or bone spur development.

The plantar fascia has three fascicles; the central fascicle is the thickest at 4 mm, the lateral fascicle is 2 mm, and the medial less than one millimeter thick. In theory, plantar fasciitis becomes more likely with increased thickness at the calcaneal insertion. A thickness of more than 4.5 mm ultrasound and 4 mm on MRI are diagnostic. Other imaging findings, such as thickening of the plantar aponeurosis, are nonspecific and have limited diagnostic value.

A Three-phase bone scan is a sensitive imaging modality. It can be used to monitor response to therapy, as demonstrated by decreased uptake after corticosteroid injections.

=== Differential diagnosis ===
The differential diagnosis for heel pain is extensive and includes pathological entities including: calcaneal stress fracture, septic arthritis, calcaneal bursitis, osteoarthritis, spinal stenosis involving the nerve roots of lumbar spinal nerve 5 (L5) or sacral spinal nerve 1 (S1), calcaneal fat pad syndrome, metastasized cancers from elsewhere in the body, hypothyroidism, gout, seronegative spondyloparthopathies such as reactive arthritis, ankylosing spondylitis, or rheumatoid arthritis (more likely if pain is present in both heels), plantar fascia rupture, and compression neuropathies such as tarsal tunnel syndrome or impingement of the medial calcaneal nerve.

Diagnosis can usually be made based on medical history and physical examination. When a physician suspects a fracture, infection, or some other serious underlying condition, an X-ray is typical. X-rays are otherwise unnecessary.

== Treatment ==
=== Non-surgical ===
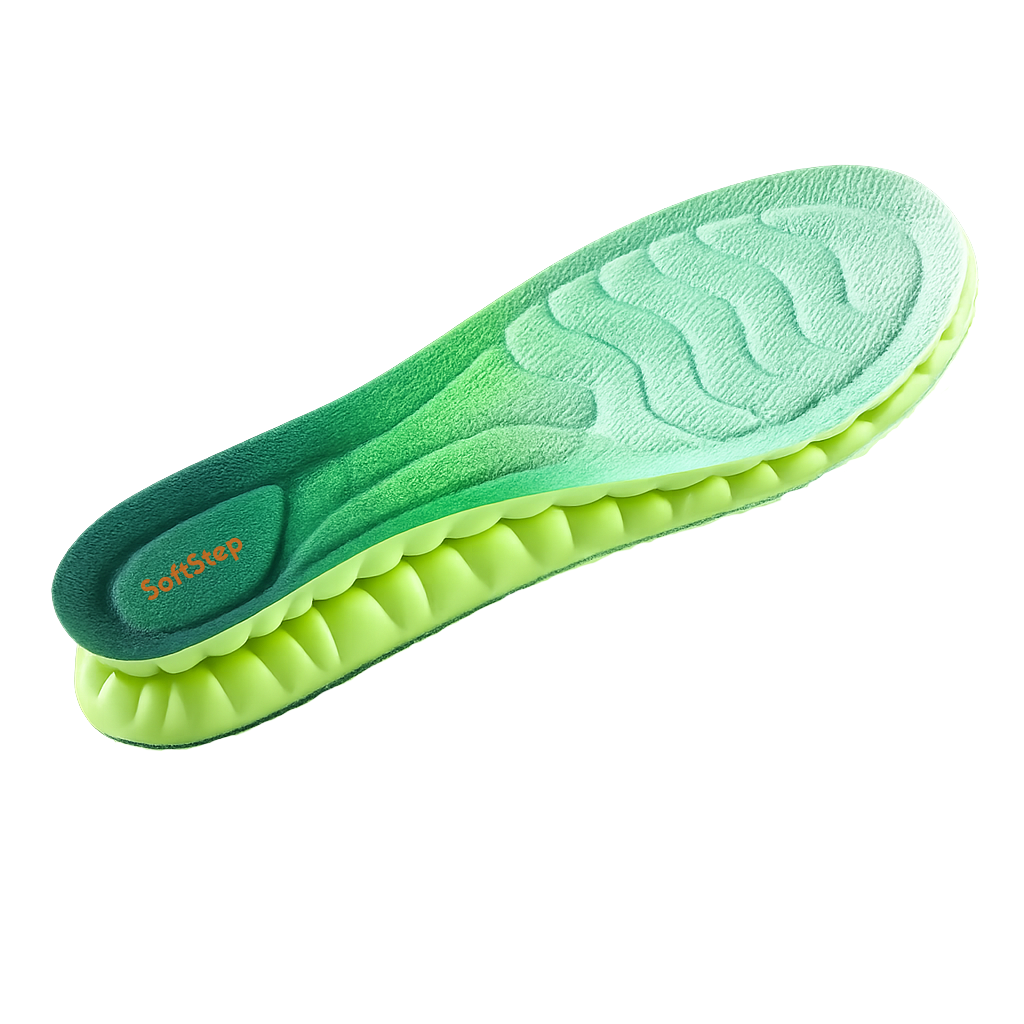
Specialist plantar insoles can be fitted inside shoes to ease pain

About 90% of plantar fasciitis cases improve within six months with conservative treatment, and within a year regardless of treatment.

=== First treatment ===
The recommended first treatment is a four- to six-week course combining stretching, foot taping (using a special tape around the foot for supporting the arch) and individually tailored education on footwear and other management options.

Reducing pain and stress involves strengthening the foot muscles that support the arches through barefoot exercising, without footwear, compared to exercising in common footwear.

Supportive insoles are a common conservative treatment. Insoles that provide arch support and cushioning may reduce strain on the plantar fascia by improving foot alignment and distributing plantar pressure more evenly during standing and walking. This reduction can help alleviate discomfort, particularly in individuals who engage in prolonged standing or repetitive weight-bearing activities.

=== Second line ===
After at least three months without improvement, extracorporeal shockwave therapy (ESWT) may be considered. Meta-analyses suggest that significant pain relief lasts up to one year after the procedure. However, debate about the therapy's efficacy continued as of 2014. ESWT may involve anesthesia, though studies suggest that anesthesia diminishes the procedure's effectiveness. Complications are rare and typically benign. Known complications include mild hematoma or ecchymosis, redness around the procedure site, or migraine.

=== Third line ===
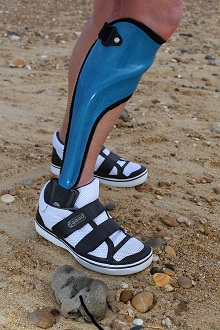
Customised foot orthoses can offer short-term pain relief.

After around 8 weeks customised foot orthoses can offer short-term relief.

Other treatments have little supportive evidence and studies. These include rest, massage, heat, ice, and calf-strengthening exercises, weight reduction in the overweight or obese, and nonsteroidal anti-inflammatory drugs (NSAIDs) such as aspirin or ibuprofen. NSAID use is common, but fails to resolve pain in 20% of people.

Corticosteroid injections are sometimes used for cases resistant to more conservative measures. Tentative evidence supports their use for short-term pain relief up to one month (only).

Comparative evidence suggests that short- and long-term treatment effects vary. Corticosteroid injections may provide greater short-term pain relief, but their benefits then fade. In contrast, therapies such as platelet-rich plasma (PRP) and ESWT are associated with improved pain and functional outcomes over longer follow-up periods. However, studies remain inconsistent, and evidence quality is limited by variability in study design, treatment protocols, and outcome measures. As a result, no single treatment is established as universally superior.

Another treatment technique is plantar iontophoresis. This technique involves applying anti-inflammatory substances such as dexamethasone or acetic acid topically to the foot and transmitting these substances through the skin with an electric current.

Some evidence supports the use of night splints for 1–3 months to relieve pain after six months. Night splints maintain the ankle in a neutral position, thereby passively stretching the calf and plantar fascia during sleep.

=== Surgery ===
Plantar fasciotomy is a surgical treatment and the last resort for refractory plantar fasciitis pain. After six months of conservative treatment, surgery is considered a last resort. Minimally invasive and endoscopic approaches to plantar fasciotomy exist, but require a specialist. The availability of these surgical techniques was limited as of 2012. A 2012 study reported that 76% of endoscopic plantar fasciotomy patients had complete symptom relief and few complications (level IV evidence). Heel spur removal during plantar fasciotomy does not appear to improve surgical outcomes.

Plantar heel pain may occur for multiple reasons. In select cases, surgeons may perform a release of the lateral plantar nerve alongside the plantar fasciotomy. Possible complications of plantar fasciotomy include nerve injury, instability of the medial longitudinal arch, fracture of the calcaneus, prolonged recovery time, infection, rupture of the plantar fascia, and failure to improve pain. Coblation surgery is proposed as an alternative surgical approach.

Gastrocnemius recession is a surgical procedure that involves lengthening the gastrocnemius muscle to reduce tension in the Achilles tendon and plantar fascia. This technique improves the ankle's range of motion, reduces pain, and can help patients return to work, sports, and weight-bearing activities more comfortably. The procedure is particularly beneficial for individuals with limited ankle dorsiflexion due to tight calf muscles, which can exacerbate plantar fasciitis symptoms.

=== Unproven treatments ===
Botulinum toxin A injections, platelet-rich plasma injections and prolotherapy remain controversial.

Dry needling is under consideration. A systematic review of available research found limited evidence of effectiveness. The studies were reported to be inadequate in quality and too diverse in methodology for a firm conclusion.However, later evidence suggested that dry needling may help reduce pain and improve function, particularly over longer follow-up periods.

A combination of plantar fascia stretching and botulinum toxin treatment showed improvements in symptoms and functional ability.

== Epidemiology ==
Plantar fasciitis is the most common type of plantar fascia injury and is the most common reason for heel pain, responsible for 80% of cases. The condition tends to occur more often in women, military recruits, older athletes, dancers, the obese, and young male athletes.

Plantar fasciitis is estimated to affect 1 in 10 people at some point during their lives, most commonly those 40-60 years old. In the United States alone, more than two million people receive treatment annually at a cost estimated to be $284 million.

=== Prognosis ===
Typically, 20-75% of individuals no longer have symptoms one year after onset.

Having a heel spur (bony protrusion at the heel) in addition to heel pain does not affect prognosis.
