= Neuromechanics of orthoses =

Neuromechanics of orthoses refers to how the human body interacts with orthoses. Millions of people in the U.S. suffer from stroke, multiple sclerosis, postpolio, spinal cord injuries, or various other ailments that benefit from the use of orthoses. Insofar as active orthoses and powered exoskeletons are concerned, the technology to build these devices is improving rapidly, but little research has been done on the human side of these human-machine interfaces.

== Active orthoses ==
Active, or powered, orthoses differ from exoskeletons in that orthoses generally refer to assistive devices to help people with disabilities walk. Exoskeletons typically refer to devices intended to augment an otherwise healthy individual's movements. However, the terms "active orthosis" and "exoskeleton" are often used interchangeably.

They can be made to either assist or resist the wearer's movement. Assisting movement is beneficial for rehabilitation, for providing soldiers and nurses with increased strength to improve job performance, and for aiding people who have repetitive jobs, such as factory workers, to prevent injury. Lastly, this technology is also used to enable people who ordinarily cannot walk by their own means to walk (eLEGS demonstration) Powered orthoses have also been made to resist or alter movement. The purpose of such orthoses is to study how the human body adapts to various difficulties. For example, if one muscle is restricted from movement, can our bodies figure out what other muscles to use instead?

=== Powering the human ===
While most articles on exoskeletons focus on how to power the device, it is also important to know how to power the human who is using it. When designing an exoskeleton, the power requirements of each joint must be understood. Through gait analysis, we know that power varies across the hip, knee, and ankle joints. How the power is dispersed across these joints changes greatly depending on how fast the person is walking, if they are walking on a hill or if they are climbing stairs

A challenge with powering the user is knowing how much power that particular person requires, and at what precise moment does he/she need that power activated. Too much or too little power will make the technology useless, but making it just right for the wearer means customizing each device.

=== Metabolic cost ===
The primary method in determining whether a device is assisting the person's task or hindering it is to measure the metabolic cost required to do the task. The metabolic cost is how much a person consumes oxygen and produces carbon dioxide while performing a task. To test whether the exoskeleton or active orthosis actually benefits the wearer, studies are done in which subjects first do the task without the device, then they do the same task while wearing the device, and the metabolic costs from the two tasks are compared.

As of 2008, only one exoskeleton (as opposed to active orthosis) had been found to actually reduce the metabolic cost of walking while carrying a load. Very little research on exoskeleton metabolic cost is done, but one study done by the U.S. Army Natick Soldier Center found that the exoskeleton they used actually increased the metabolic cost by 40%.

In 2012, S. Galle et al. studied the metabolic cost of a powered ankle-foot extensor that assisted users with push-off while walking. After about 20 minutes to adapt to the device, the users metabolic cost of walking was reduced by 9%.

=== Control ===
Ferris discusses the influence of controller types in his paper, A Physiologist's Perspective on Robotic Exoskeletons for Human Locomotion.

Various methods for controlling lower limb active orthoses or exoskeletons:

- Utilize sensory information from the exoskeleton and only use the human to provide a gentle push in the direction he/she wants to go
- Foot sensors detect where the user wants to go
- User freely moves hips in flexion and a set of full-bridge strain gauges attach to the shin of the exoskeleton and a potentiometer on the knee joint
- Ground reaction force sensors in the shoes, skin-surface electromyographic (EMG) electrodes between the hip and knee on both the fronts and back sides of the legs, potentiometers on the joints, a gyroscope and an accelerometer on the backpack to determine torso position
- Use an elastic band to attach force sensing resistors (FSRs) to the skin above a muscle. When that muscle flexes, the sensor feels the force and outputs the strength of the force along with joint angle data from a potentiometer to determine the torque required at the specified joint
- Use both ground reaction force and a forward/backward pressure sensor that the user can manipulate with his/her feet
- Footswitch-controlled, in which the artificial muscle is activated when the user's forefoot contacts the ground
- EMG-controlled, in which the amplitude of the user's muscle flexion determines the amount of force the artificial muscle provides
- Push button-controlled for a bilateral ankle-foot orthosis, for people with partial paralysis. The user pushes a button on a handheld device. Some users found that this requires too much concentration, while others liked the feeling of control they had.

=== Use in research ===
Some active orthoses have been created for the sole purpose of research. According to neurophysiologist Dr. Keith Gordon, "locomotor adaptation in humans is not well understood. To provide insight into the neural reorganization that occurs following a significant disruption to one's learned neuromuscular map relating a given motor command to its resulting muscular action, we tied the mechanical action of a robotic exoskeleton to the EMG profile of the soleus muscle during walking". Daniel Ferris concurs in another paper, saying, "many key issues in locomotor physiology are either not well understood or under heated debate" His research team custom-made active orthoses for his research subjects to wear while walking on a treadmill. When the subject flexed his/her soleus muscle in order to plantar flex (which allows a person to push off the ground while walking), the device would restrict the subject's movement, forcing his/her foot towards dorsiflexion. After an hour of walking with the device (a break was included), the subjects used their soleus and gastrocnemius muscles less, so they wouldn't be forced to dorsiflex as much, but they were not able to fully adapt to the requirements of the device.

Another study by Gordon's team showed that when the device works with our muscles, we adapt more easily. For example, he had subjects wear an active orthosis on one leg which performed a very strong plantar flexion every time they flexed the soleus, which is expected to plantar flex. However, the plantar flexion performed by the device was too strong and the subjects had to only use a minimal amount of muscle strength on that one leg in order to walk normally. People were able to adapt to this difficulty in under 30 minutes. Another study by S. Galle, et al., found similar results in the paper, "Adaptation to walking with an exoskeleton that assists ankle extension" Gregory Sawiki, Keith Gordon, and Daniel Ferris together did a study on an active lower limb orthosis to understand how the device can be used to improve motor rehabilitation. After experimenting with different types of control (finding that some subjects thought that having a push button to activate the device required too much concentration, while others liked having the control over activation of the device), the team concluded that the ankle-foot orthosis they used needs a lot of improvements for rehabilitation, but could be "valuable in probing the relationship between gait mechanics and metabolic cost."

=== Considerations ===
According to Hugh Herr, the performance of an orthosis should be based upon measurements of "metabolic cost of transport, walking speed, smoothness and repeatability of motions, muscle fatigue, and stability" as well as "the reduction of forces borne by the musculoskeletal system".

Power source, portability and weight are the biggest challenges facing active orthoses. A sufficient power source with today's technology adds too much weight to the device, making it difficult to do much more than lift itself. For that reason, most active orthoses are tethered to a power source - which works well enough for research and patient rehabilitation, since that also means a computer is always nearby Other challenges when making an active orthosis is the close interface with the human. This presents difficulties with aligning the joints of the operator with the joints of the device, constraining the human's movements by attaching the device to his/her body, other forces from the device that resist movement, controlling the machine while wearing it, determining how the device is changing the human's biomechanics, and ensuring the safety of the wearer. Patients in need of powered orthoses may have pathological conditions such as muscle weakness or spasticity, brain injury, or sensory loss, or they may have suffered an athletic injury or a number of different maladies. Each patient requires a specific alteration to his or her gait. The orthosis must be able to generate power at the precise moment the patient is having trouble with his or her stride

=== Examples ===
- LOPES
- Lokomat
- AutoAmbulator
- The Mechanized Gait Trainer
- General Electric's Hardiman (1971)
- Berkeley Lower Extremity Exoskeleton
- Ekso bionics

==== Knee ====
Thousands of people suffer from knee injuries, and because the knee supports the body weight during the stance phase while walking, more active orthoses are being made to relieve weight off the knee while in the stance phase.

After suffering a neurological injury, patients typically must go through locomotor training that can involve several therapists. The task is quite hard on the therapist(s), so several devices have been made to assist with this problem. The Lokomat, AutoAmbulator, and the Mechanized Gait Trainer were all made to function with a treadmill. Wearable gait trainers would be useful to travel over ground. This adds the complications involved with starting and stopping a stride, changing direction, going up and down hills, and creating more challenging balancing exercises.

==== Foot ====
An extensive study was done to determine how thick the sole of a soldier's boot could be before it interfered with his/her actions. It was found that a 2-inch thick sole affected certain squatting positions and was less comfortable than a thinner sole, but can ultimately be implemented in exoskeleton designs. The purpose of the study was to determine how much space could be made available for sensors in a soldier's exoskeleton boot.

== Passive orthoses ==
Passive orthoses do not require external power and are less likely to have moving parts. However, many passive orthoses have been developed to aid movement through use of springs and other such moving parts.

=== Examples ===
- Shoe inserts
- Kickstart (orthosis)
- University of Michigan's eExo

== Photos/videos ==
- Exoskeletons Around the World
- Demonstration of eLEGS

== See also ==
- Powered exoskeleton
- Orthotics
- Cognitive orthotics
- Berkeley Lower Extremity Exoskeleton
- Hugh Herr
- Prosthetics
- Neuromechanics
- Rehabilitation robotics
- RO-MAN (Robot-Human Interaction IEEE site)
