= Shin splints =

Inflammation of the inner edge of the shin bone (tibia)

- Other names: Medial tibial stress syndrome (MTSS), soleus syndrome, tibial stress syndrome, periostitis
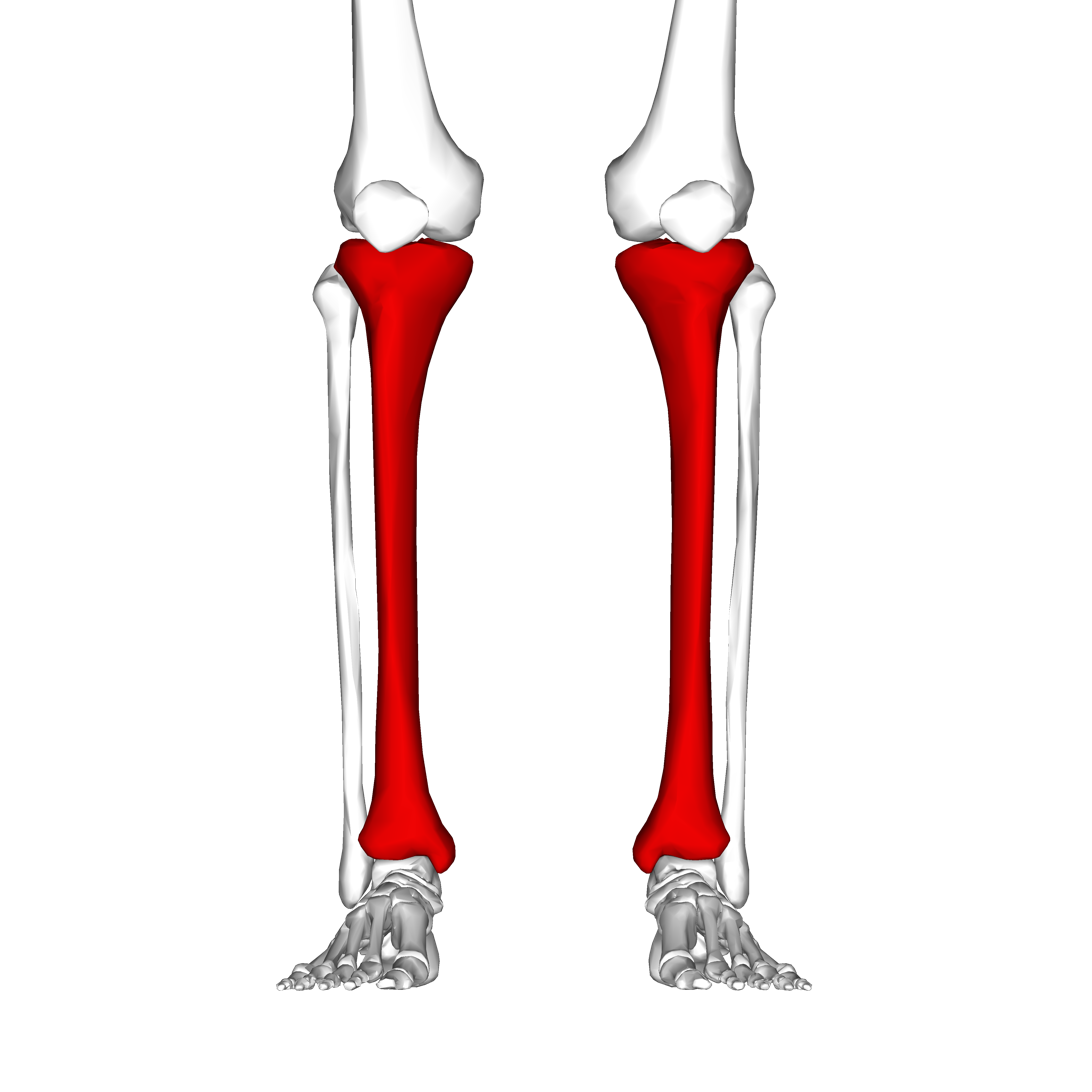
- Red area represents the tibia. Pain is generally in the inner and lower 2/3rds of tibia.
- Specialty: Sports medicine
- Symptoms: Pain along the inside edge of the shinbone
- Complications: Stress fracture
- Risk factors: Runners, dancers, cheerleading, military personnel
- Diagnostic method: Based on symptoms, medical imaging
- Differential diagnosis: Stress fracture, tendinitis, exertional compartment syndrome
- Treatment: Rest with gradual return to exercise
- Prognosis: Good
- Frequency: 4% to 35% (at-risk groups)

A shin splint, also known as medial tibial stress syndrome, is pain along the inside edge of the shinbone (tibia) due to inflammation of tissue in the area. Generally this is between the middle of the lower leg and the ankle. The pain may be dull or sharp, and is generally brought on by high-impact exercise that overloads the tibia. It generally resolves during periods of rest. Complications may include stress fractures.

Shin splints typically occur due to excessive physical activity. Groups that are commonly affected include runners, dancers, gymnasts, and military personnel. The underlying mechanism is not entirely clear. Diagnosis is generally based on the symptoms, with medical imaging done to rule out other possible causes.

Shin splints are generally treated by rest followed by a gradual return to exercise over a period of weeks. Other measures such as nonsteroidal anti-inflammatory drugs (NSAIDs), cold packs, physical therapy, and compression may be used. Shoe insoles may help some people. Surgery is rarely required, but may be done if other measures are not effective. Rates of shin splints in at-risk groups range from 4% to 35%. The condition occurs more often in women. It was first described in 1958.

== Signs and symptoms ==
Shin splint pain is described as a recurring dull ache, sometimes becoming an intense pain, along the inner part of the lower two-thirds of the tibia. The pain increases during exercise, and some individuals experience swelling in the pain area. In contrast, stress fracture pain is localized to the fracture site.

Women are several times more likely to progress to stress fractures from shin splints. This is due in part to women having a higher incidence of diminished bone density and osteoporosis.

== Causes ==
Risk factors for developing shin splints include:

- Flat feet or rigid arches
- Being overweight
- Excessively tight calf muscles (which can cause excessive pronation)
- Engaging the anti-pronatory (supinating) muscles in excessive amounts of eccentric muscle activity
- Undertaking high-impact exercises on hard, non-compliant surfaces (such as running on asphalt or concrete)

People who have previously had shin splints are more likely to have them again.

== Pathophysiology ==
While the exact mechanism is unknown, shin splints can be attributed to the overloading of the lower leg due to biomechanical irregularities resulting in an increase in stress exerted on the tibia. A sudden increase in intensity or frequency in activity level fatigues muscles too quickly to help shock absorption properly, forcing the tibia to absorb most of the impact. Lack of cushioning footwear, especially on hard surfaces, does not absorb transmitting forces while running or jumping. This stress is associated with the onset of shin splints. Muscle imbalance, including weak core muscles, inflexibility and tightness of lower leg muscles, including the gastrocnemius, soleus, and plantar muscles (commonly the flexor digitorum longus) can increase the possibility of shin splints. The pain associated with shin splints is caused from a disruption of Sharpey's fibres that connect the medial soleus fascia through the periosteum of the tibia where it inserts into the bone. With repetitive stress, the impact forces eccentrically fatigue the soleus and create repeated tibial bending or bowing, contributing to shin splints. The impact is made worse by running uphill, downhill, on uneven terrain, or on hard surfaces. Improper footwear, including worn-out shoes, can also contribute to shin splints.

== Diagnosis ==
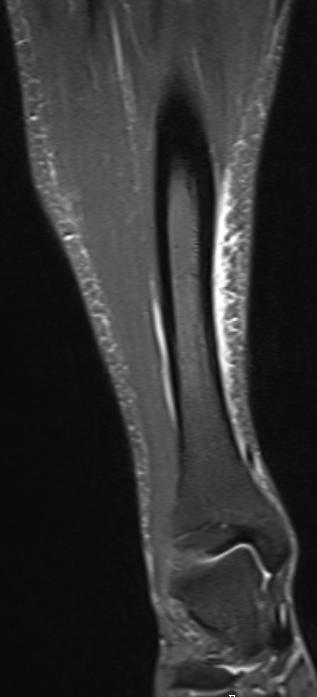
Magnetic resonance image of the lower leg in the coronal plane showing high signal (bright) areas around the tibia as signs of shin splints.

Shin splints are generally diagnosed from a history and physical examination. The important factors on history are the location of pain, what triggers the pain, and the absence of cramping or numbness.

On physical examination, gentle pressure over the tibia will recreate the type of pain experienced. Generally more than a 5 cm length of tibia is involved. Swelling, redness, or poor pulses in addition to the symptoms of shin splints indicate a different underlying cause.

=== Differential diagnosis ===
Other potential causes include stress fractures, compartment syndrome, nerve entrapment, and popliteal artery entrapment syndrome. If the cause is unclear, medical imaging such as a bone scan or magnetic resonance imaging (MRI) may be performed. Bone scans and MRI can differentiate between stress fractures and shin splints.

== Treatment ==
It is important to reduce significantly any pain or swelling before returning to activity.

Treatments include rest, ice, and gradually returning to activity. Rest and ice help the tibia to recover from sudden, high levels of stress and reduce inflammation and pain levels.

Strengthening exercises should be performed after pain has subsided, on calves, quadriceps and gluteals. Cross training (e.g., cycling, swimming, boxing) is recommended in order to maintain aerobic fitness.

Individuals should return to activity gradually, beginning with a short and low intensity level. Over multiple weeks, they can slowly work up to normal activity level. It is important to decrease activity level if any pain returns. Individuals should consider running on other surfaces besides asphalt, such as grass, to decrease the amount of force the lower leg must absorb.

Orthoses and insoles help to offset biomechanical irregularities, like pronation, and help to support the arch of the foot.

Other conservative interventions include improving form during exercise, footwear refitting, orthotics, manual therapy, balance training (e.g., using a balance board), cortisone injections, and calcium and vitamin D supplementation.

Deep tissue massage is one of the massage techniques that may be useful. A technique such as deep transverse friction to relieve muscle tightness will help stop the build-up of scar tissue. This can overall release tension in the calf muscle area, relieving pressure that is causing pain.

Less-common forms of treatment for more-severe cases of shin splints include extracorporeal shockwave therapy (ESWT) and surgery. Surgery does not guarantee 100% recovery, and is only performed in extreme cases where non-surgical options have been tried for at least a year.

== Epidemiology ==
Rates of shin splints in at-risk groups are 4% to 35%. Women are affected more often than men.
