= Pronation of the foot =

Type of foot movement

Pronation is a natural movement of the foot that occurs during foot landing while running or walking. Composed of three cardinal plane components: subtalar eversion, ankle dorsiflexion, and forefoot abduction, these three distinct motions of the foot occur simultaneously during the pronation phase. Pronation is a normal, desirable, and necessary component of the gait cycle. Pronation is the first half of the stance phase, whereas supination starts the propulsive phase as the heel begins to lift off the ground.

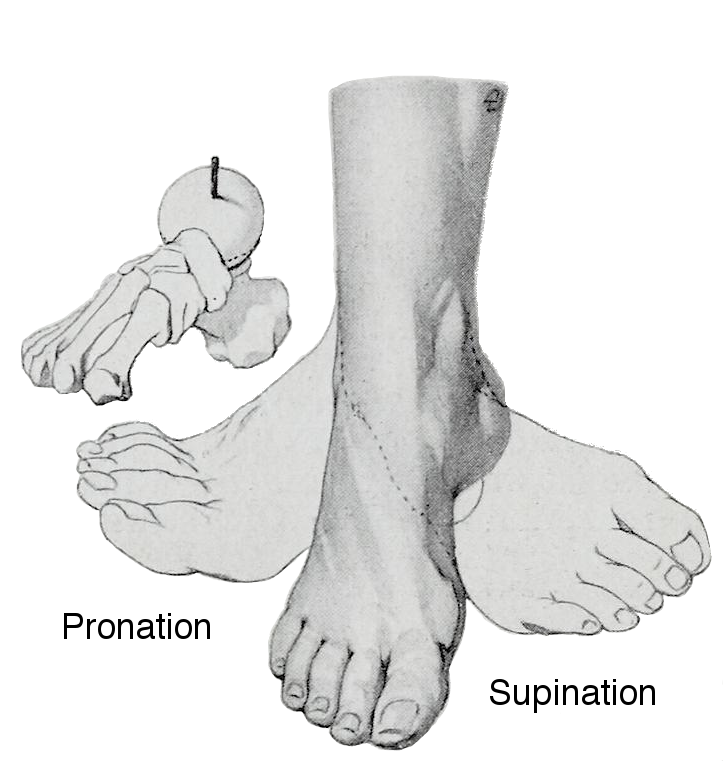
An illustration of pronation and supination of the foot from an anatomy textbook

== Types ==
The normal biomechanics of the foot absorb and direct the occurring throughout the gait whereas the foot is flexible (pronation) and rigid (supination) during different phases of the gait cycle. As the foot is loaded, eversion of the subtalar joint, dorsiflexion of the ankle, and abduction of the forefoot occur. Pronation should not occur past the latter stages of midstance, as the normal foot should then supinate in preparation for toe-off.

Abnormal pronation occurs when a foot pronates when it should supinate, or overpronates during a normal pronation period of the gait cycle. Approximately four degrees of pronation and supination are necessary to enable the foot to propel forward properly. In the neutral position, the foot is neither pronating nor supinating. If the foot is pronating or supinating during the stance phase of the gait cycle when it ought to be in the neutral position, a biomechanical problem may exist.

Although varying definitions exist as described by Horwood and Chockalingam, for choosing appropriate footwear, pronation could be described in three simple terms: neutral pronation, overpronation, and underpronation.

=== Neutral pronation ===
Some pronation, also called eversion, is natural in the body's regular movement. Neutral pronation occurs when the foot experiences a normal, healthy amount of pronation instead of overpronating or underpronating. In healthy movement, more of the toe area will be used when pushing off than an unhealthy movement. In neutral pronation, the weight distributes fairly evenly among all of the toes with a slight emphasis on the big toe and second toe, which are better adapted to handle more of the load.

=== Overpronation ===
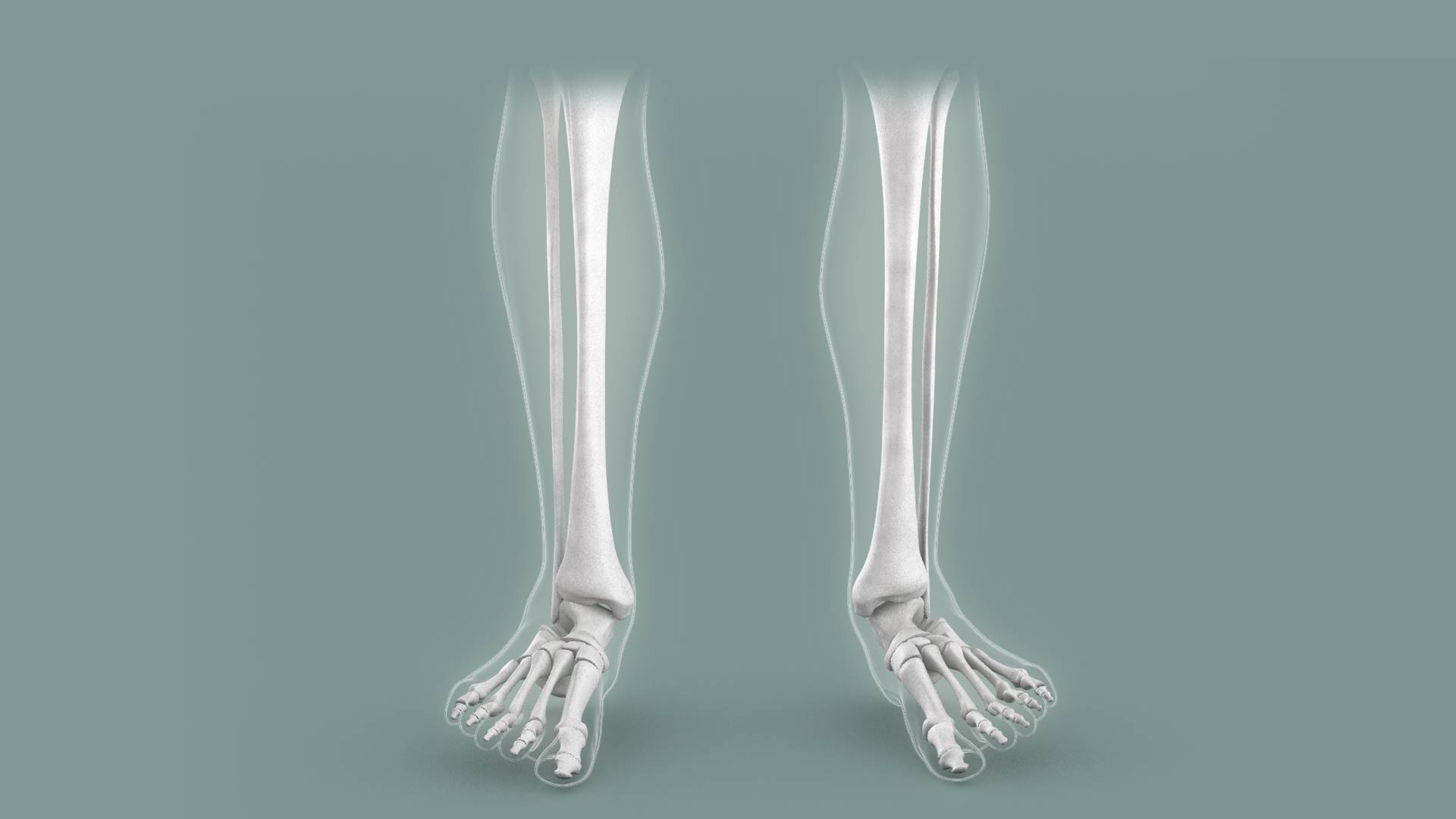
Overpronation

Those who overpronate tend to push off almost completely from the big toe and second toe. As a result, the shock from the foot's impact does not spread evenly throughout the foot and the ankle has trouble stabilizing the rest of the body. Additionally, an unnatural angle forms between the foot and ankle and the foot splays out abnormally. It is common even for people who pronate normally to have some angle between the foot and the ankle, but not to the extent seen in those who overpronate. In normal pronation, the weight distributes evenly throughout the foot.

==== Causes ====
There are many possible causes for overpronation, but researchers have not yet determined an underlying cause. Hintermann states, "Compensatory overpronation may occur for anatomical reasons, such as a tibia vara of 10 degrees or more, forefoot varus, leg length discrepancy, ligamentous laxity, or because of muscular weakness or tightness in the gastrocnemius and soleus muscles." Pronation can be influenced by sources outside of the body as well. Shoes have been shown to significantly influence pronation. Hintermann states that the same person can have different amounts of pronation just by using different running shoes. "It is easily possible that the maximal ankle joint eversion movement is 31 degrees for one and 12 degrees for another running shoe."

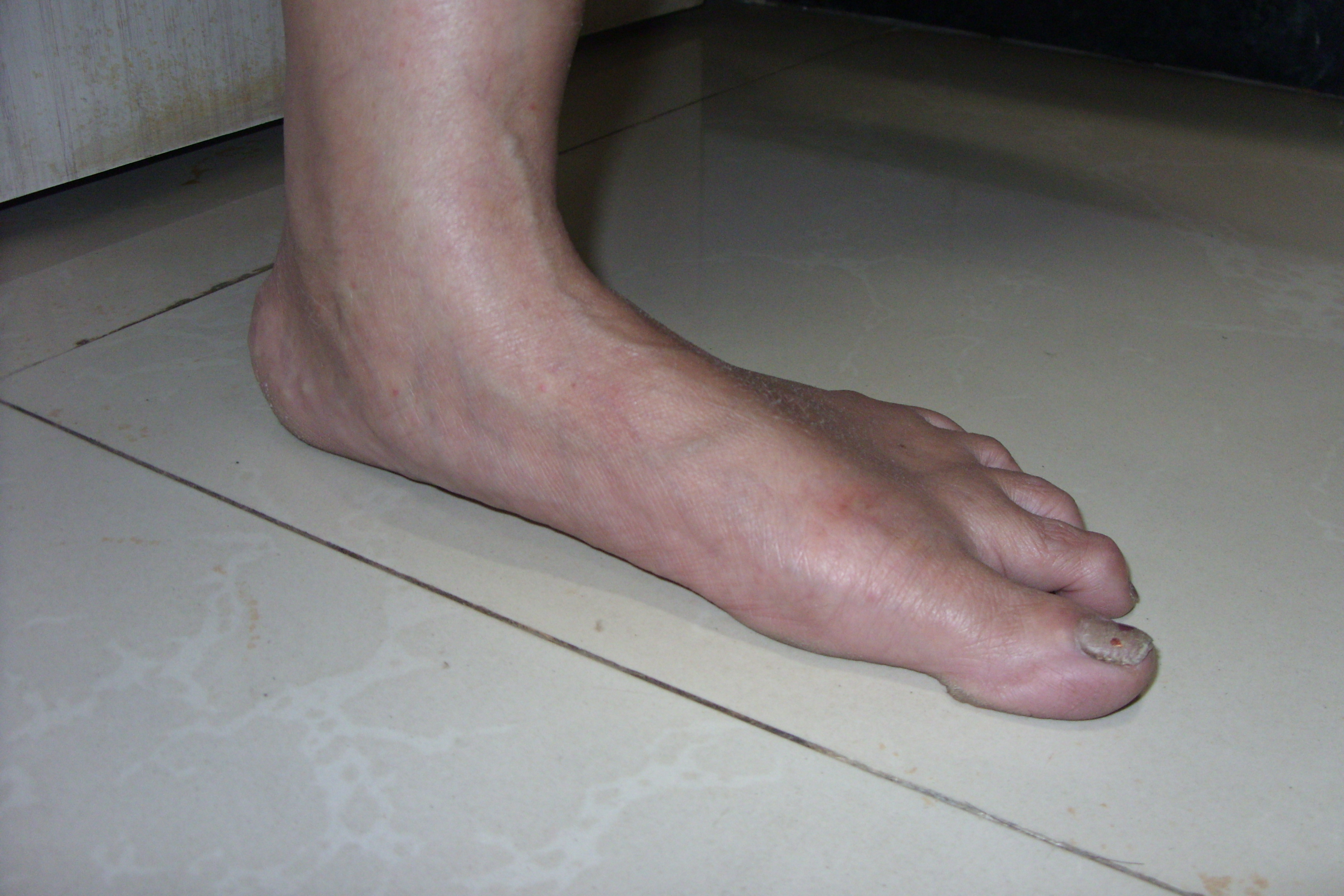
Flat foot

There has been some speculation as to whether arch height has an effect on pronation. After conducting a study at the Rose-Hulman Institute of Technology, Maggie Boozer suggests that people with higher arches tend to pronate to a greater degree. However, the generally accepted view by professionals is that the most pronation is present in those with lower arch heights. To complicate matters, one study done by Hylton Menz at the University of Western Sydney-Macarthur suggests that the methods for measuring arch height and determining whether someone is "flat-footed" or "high-arched" are unreliable. He says, "For this reason, studies investigating the relationship between static arch height motion of the rearfoot have consistently found that such a classification system is a poor predictor of dynamic rearfoot function."

==== Effects ====
Overpronation may have secondary effects on the lower legs, such as increased rotation of the tibia, which may result in lower leg or knee problems. Overpronation is usually associated with many overuse injuries in running, including medial tibial stress syndrome, or shin splints, and knee pain. Hintermann states: "Individuals with injuries typically have pronation movement that is about two to four degrees greater than that of those with no injuries." He adds, however, that between 40% and 50% of runners who overpronate do not have overuse injuries. This suggests that, although pronation may have an effect on certain injuries, it is not the only factor influencing their development.

==== Prevention/treatment ====
===== Orthotics =====
The design principles of foot orthoses are founded on knowledge of the functional anatomy of the foot. Pronation of the foot is triplanar. The axis of rotation in the foot joints is not perpendicular to any of the cardinal planes (sagittal, horizontal, frontal) of the human body. The triplanar motion of the foot postulates that blocking of any one component of triplanar motion in a single cardinal plane prevents movement in the other two planes as well. This all-or-nothing rule is the premise for orthotic posting or wedging.

Supportive orthotics in the shoe is a method commonly implemented to treat many common running injuries associated with excessive pronation. Orthotics are the most effective treatment for symptoms that develop from biomechanics within the body such as overpronation, resulting in either great improvement or complete healing of the injury in about half the cases.

===== Shoe type =====
Foot pronation tends to increase in runners as mileage also increases, potentially increasing the risk for injury. Motion control shoes are a specific type of running shoe designed to limit these excessive foot motions by reducing the amount of plantar force (a force generated by excess pronation). Motion control and stability shoes have increased medial support which may increase stability to the foot and leg and lower the amount of pronation in the foot.

===== Taping =====
Certain methods of taping the foot and leg have also been shown to be effective in preventing overpronation. In a study conducted at the University of Queensland, a taping procedure known as the LowDye taping technique was shown to be effective in controlling pronation during both movement and standing.

===== Shoe-lacing patterns =====
Specific patterns of lacing running shoes also reduce pronation. Pronation significantly decreases when the highest number of eyelets in the shoe is used for lacing and the shoes are tied as tight as possible.

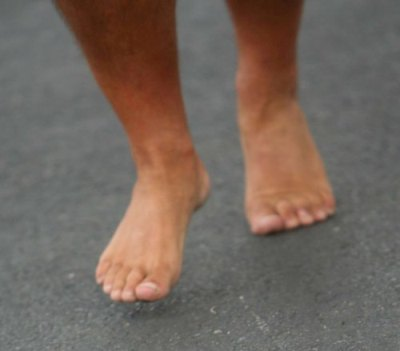
Closeup of a person running barefoot

===== Barefoot running =====
Running barefoot has been seen to decrease pronation on the foot's impact with the ground. A study's investigations show that this is connected to a large torsional movement between forefoot and rearfoot which can be influenced by the shoe sole construction, with the heel pitch placing the foot into a slightly plantar flexed position, which can result in increased pronation during the pre-swing phase. According to researchers at the Biomechanics Laboratory of the Swiss Federal Institute of Technology, "The least amount of pronation takes place when running barefoot."

=== Supination ===
Supination is the opposite, and occurs when the foot impacts the ground and there is not enough of an "inward roll" in the foot's motion. The weight of the body is not transferred at all to the big toe, forcing the outside of the foot and the smaller toes which cannot handle the stress as well to take the majority of the overweight instead.

Runner's World states, "[Underpronators] do best in a neutral-cushioned shoe that encourages a more natural foot motion." Since underpronators' feet do not roll inward like overpronators', support is not necessarily needed to correct supination as it is to correct overpronation.

== See also ==
- Anatomical terms of motion
- Comparison of orthotics
- Toe walking
