= Veterinary orthotics =

Pet orthotics refers to the use of orthotics for pets. Orthotics is an allied health care field concerned with the design, development, fitting, and manufacture of orthoses. Orthoses, sometimes called braces or splints, are devices that support or correct musculoskeletal deformities and/or abnormalities of the body.

Animals that might benefit from the use of an orthosis commonly have an injury to a lower limb or paw, such as a fracture, torn meniscus, ruptured Achilles tendon, or injured cruciate ligament (ACL or CCL). They may also have an orthopedic condition due to arthritis, spinal cord injury, or a congenital abnormality. Animals that have used orthoses and prostheses (artificial limbs) include dogs, cats, horses, llamas, and an orangutan. Each animal's situation is unique and should be evaluated by a veterinarian.

== Orthoses ==
Orthoses can decrease pain and increase stability in an unstable joint, as well as prevent potential progression or development of a deformity or contracture. An orthosis will prevent, control or even assist the motion of a joint, depending upon how it is made. An orthosis can be made for short-term use during a post-operative healing period, for example, or for long-term chronic use. They can provide a good quality of life for an animal that might otherwise have to be euthanized.

With a few exceptions, orthoses for animals are custom-made from a cast. They are typically formed from lightweight plastic or carbon fiber material with a comfort liner inside and velcro to hold them in place. They may have solid joints or hinged joints.

An orthotic differs from a prosthetic in that a prosthetic completely replaces a missing limb or body part, whereas an orthotic is an external device that is meant to help support or protect a limb or body part.

The most common orthotic, especially for dogs, are booties. They have a wide range of uses for the dog, including traction while getting up or walking on slippery surfaces such as hardwood or tile flooring. They can especially help dogs with hip issues and dogs with neurological conditions who are less aware of their self-movement (proprioception).

Another form of orthotic is a leg brace that can improve stabilization for issues caused by age, worn-out bones in the foot, or ectrodactyly. This is the deficiency of one or more central digits of the foot, causing the animal's foot to become deformed. Proper support is necessary or more serious health issues can arise in the future.

== Misaligned teeth ==
Malpositions should be corrected as early as possible. The sooner the problem is resolved, and the younger the animal, the easier and faster a correction using dog braces or other methods is possible since the bones are still remodeled due to the growth. The misaligned teeth are often congenital, i.e., the causes are genetic. They are already visible in the young dog, e.g., excess teeth, deciduous teeth that have not failed, or jaw malformations. As with humans, there are also braces or other appliances for orthodontic treatment in dogs. With the help of these methods, teeth in the jaw, for example, can be realigned and thus integrated into the healthy row of teeth. There are different systems of dog braces.

== Factors ==
=== Fit, material, and functionality ===
When looking at purchasing or constructing an orthotic for a pet, several factors must be taken into consideration to ensure the animal's health and wellness. These include how the orthotic sits on the body, the material being used, and the functionality of the product. The fit is also important for prosthetics for the area of attachment so it is comfortable and does not cause irritation to the skin. Material is also a consideration: if the skin is irritated or damaged, it can have a greater impact on the animal than if it were not wearing the orthotic at all, in some cases. The functionality of the orthotic affects both owner and pet. An orthotic or a prosthetic needs to be monitored regularly. Orthotics need to be removed several times daily to check the condition of the skin. For this reason, it is better if they are easier to take on and off, both in terms of ease and in avoiding irritation to the skin by removing or putting on the orthotic in a cumbersome way. It also helps the pet to stay calm if it is not such a laborious task. For functionality, the product itself and how it will serve the pet are important considerations. An orthotic that interferes with the pet's daily life and range of motion is problematic. Even if the pet wears it while standing, it might not function well enough when trying to get up from lying down. The orthotic must also be kept clean, both from dirt from everyday activities and sweat build-up, and if the pet gets dirty.

=== Cost and alternatives ===
Depending on the orthotic, they can be expensive. 3D printing can be a cost-effective alternative. 3D printing is an additive manufacturing process where filament is layered on top of itself to create a three-dimensional object. This differs from more traditional subtractive manufacturing processes, like drilling, where the material is taken away to form a whole. Free online versions of different orthotics are available to print if a more general model is suitable; they can also be adapted to fit the owner and pet's needs. Libraries may be a source of complimentary or donation-based printing for the public. Custom orthotics can also be designed in 3D modeling software.

== See also ==
- Veterinary medicine
- Meadow (calf)
