= Cadence Biomedical =

- Founded: 2007
- Headquarters: Washington, United States
- Number of locations: Seattle
- Website: www.cadencebiomedical.com

Cadence Biomedical is a medical device company that provides orthotic products to help individuals with severe mobility impairments to walk again. The company is located in Seattle, Washington and was founded in 2007 under the name Empowering Engineering Technologies.

== Products ==
Cadence Biomedical released its first product, the Kickstart Walking System, in August 2012. Kickstart is a wearable device, or orthosis, that gives users stability and the ability to walk independently. The device is intended to improve mobility for those in stroke recovery, or for individuals with neurological injuries such as spinal cord injury, traumatic brain injury, multiple sclerosis or muscular dystrophy. It is designed to provide walking assistance and stability for those who have difficulty walking, especially if they experience difficulty lifting their knee, catching toes when taking a step, lack of endurance, or problems with coordination, balance, or stability.

The device uses no external power or batteries to provide assistance, but functions similarly to robotic exoskeletons in that it helps to move the legs forward and augments existing strength. The product was released in 2012 and is available through orthotists in the United States.
