= Providence brace =

Nighttime spinal orthosis for adolescent idiopathic scoliosis

- Synonyms: Providence Nocturnal Scoliosis System, Providence nighttime brace
- Specialty: Orthotics, pediatrics
- Intervention: Stop progression of scoliosis curve
- Inventor(s): Charles d'Amato; Barry McCoy
- Invention date: 1992
- Manufacturer: Spinal Technology, Inc.
- [edit on Wikidata]

The Providence brace is a nighttime spinal orthosis for the treatment of adolescent idiopathic scoliosis (AIS). The brace is used to curb the natural progression of scoliosis and prevent further curvature of the AIS patient's spine. The Providence brace was developed by Charles d'Amato and Barry McCoy, and is manufactured by Spinal Technology, Inc.

== Medical use ==
The Providence brace is among the treatments prescribed to slow or stop further curvature of the spine as scoliosis patients naturally age and grow. While in use, the brace brings the spine closer to the midline or even further by applying both lateral and rotational pressure on the patient's body. The brace applies pressure at three points on the body while the patient is in the supine position, which itself plays a significant part in correcting the coronal plane curvature of the spine.

The brace is worn for at least eight hours at night and during sleep as it significantly limits mobility while in use. The brace is indicated for adolescent patients with curves of less 35°. A recent study indicates that the brace is also effective for curvatures up to 45°. When used on appropriate patients, Providence brace has been shown to have a comparable efficacy as traditional scoliosis orthoses (such as the Boston brace) that require full-time use. Studies report that 50% to 75% of patients show further curve progression of only 5° or less, including when examined two years after stopping use of the brace. A 2019 study also reported that, if an in-brace correction of more than 70% is achieved, the Providence brace was successful in preventing curve progression in 89% of compliant patients.

== History ==
In 1992, Charles d'Amato and Barry McCoy created a board on which scoliosis patients can be positioned in a way that corrected the curvature of their spine. Developed at Hasbro Children's Hospital in Providence, Rhode Island, the device allowed patients to lie on their back with little discomfort during medical imaging. D'Amato and McCoy applied the same principles to create a wearable brace for nocturnal use by adolescent patients at home. The Providence brace gets its name from the city where it was developed like its predecessors such as the Milwaukee brace, the Boston brace, the Wilmington brace, and Charleston brace.

The Providence brace is designed and custom fitted using a specialized measuring board and a digital model of the patient's body, accompanied by X-rays of the patient's spinal deformity. A CAD/CAM model is used to make the brace out of copoly plastic which is then modified to ensure optimal correction of the spinal curvature. The brace is manufactured by Spinal Technology, Inc., based in West Yarmouth, Massachusetts, and marketed under the name Providence Nocturnal Scoliosis System.
