= Cognitive orthotics =

Reminder systems for people with cognitive impairment

Cognitive orthotics are software-based personal reminder systems for people with cognitive impairments, such as memory loss.

Cognitive impairments can lead to challenges with independence skills, including activities of daily living. Those with mild intellectual disability can acquire sufficient skills independence, whereas those categorized as having moderate intellectual disabilities seldom reach this degree of independence. While training programs can serve as a means to instill and support independent living, those programs have shown varying degrees of success, depending on the individual in question and the tasks at hand. The number of steps or complexity of certain daily routine tasks can make them challenging for a person with cognitive impairments, and a mistake in any steps can lead to an unacceptable result.

Tools such as computers have been used in the rehabilitation of people with brain injuries. Beginning with "prosthetic memory" and in the 1980s shifting towards addressing brain dysfunction through repetitive practice, only a few psychologists were developing software for traumatic brain injury patients, resulting in a scarcity of available programs. Cognitive rehabilitation specialists opted for commercially available computer games that were visually appealing, engaging, repetitive, and entertaining, theorizing their potential remedial effects on neuropsychological dysfunction. The outcomes of initial computer-based rehabilitation interventions were restricted and, in several aspects, fell short of expectations. While repetitive practice improved performance in the specific task practiced, this effect did not extend to other tasks.

People who can benefit from cognitive orthotics include the elderly, people who have experienced TBIs, anyone who experiences memory loss, or have other intellectual or developmental disabilities. The software may include elements of machine learning, artificial intelligence, and context awareness to accommodate the needs of the individuals more appropriately.

== See also ==
- Assistive technology
- Dementia
- Orthotics
- Memory aid
