= Orthotics =

Medical specialty that focuses on the design and application of orthoses

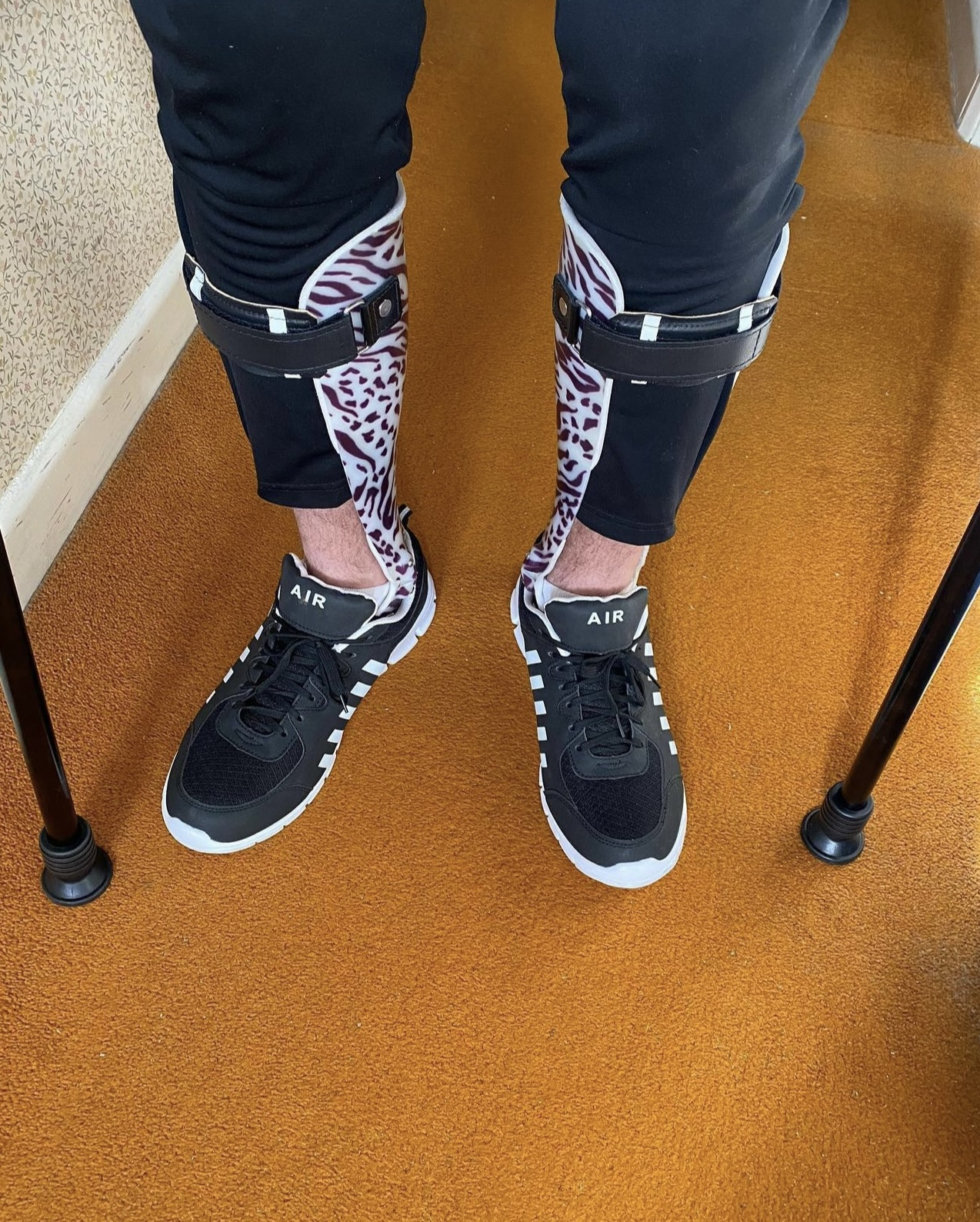
A pair of AFO (ankle-foot orthosis) braces being used to aid bilateral foot drop

Orthotics is a medical specialty that focuses on the design and application of orthoses, sometimes known as braces, calipers, or splints. An orthosis is "an externally applied device used to influence the structural and functional characteristics of the neuromuscular and skeletal systems." Orthotists are medical professionals who specialize in designing orthotic devices such as braces or foot orthoses.

== Classification ==
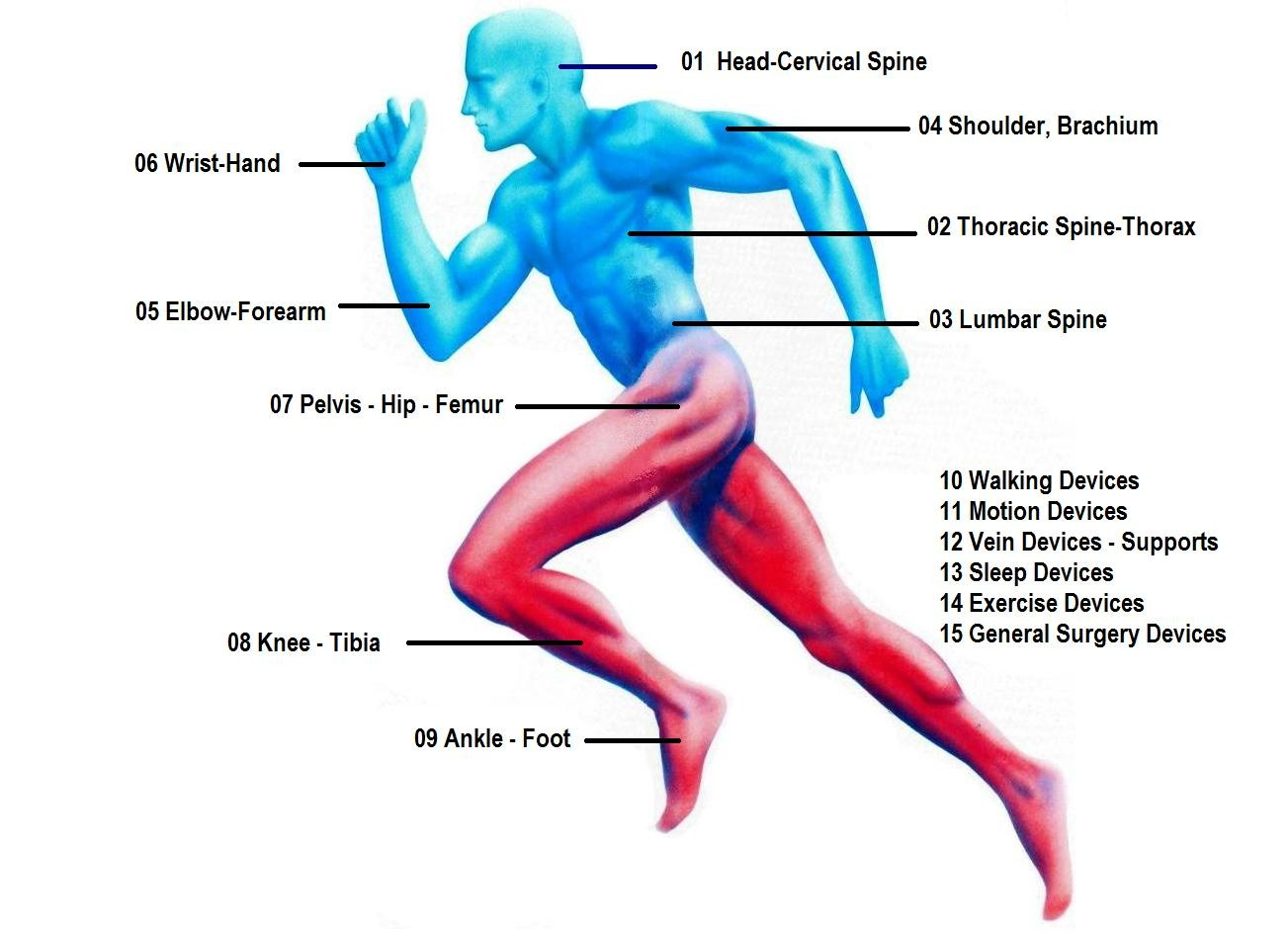
Codification of orthoses

Orthotic devices are classified into four areas of the body according to the international classification system (ICS): orthotics of the lower extremities, orthotics of the upper extremities, orthotics for the trunk, and orthotics for the head. Orthoses are also classified by function: paralysis orthoses and relief orthoses.

Under the ISO terminology, orthoses are classified by an acronym describing the anatomical joints they support. Some examples include KAFO, or knee-ankle-foot orthoses, which span the knee, ankle, and foot; TLSO, or thoracic-lumbar-sacral orthoses, supporting the thoracic, lumbar and sacral regions of the spine. The use of the ISO standard is promoted to reduce the widespread variation in the description of orthoses, which is often a barrier to interpreting research studies.

The transition from an orthosis to a prosthesis can be fluid. An example is compensating for a leg length discrepancy, equivalent to replacing a missing part of a limb. Another example is the replacement of the forefoot after a forefoot amputation. This treatment is often made from a combination of a prosthesis to replace the forefoot and an orthosis to replace the lost muscular function (ortho-prosthesis).

== Orthotist ==
An orthotist is a specialist responsible for the customising, manufacture, and repair of orthotic devices (orthoses). The manufacture of modern orthoses requires both artistic skills in modeling body shapes and manual skills in processing traditional and innovative materials—CAD/CAM, CNC machines and 3D printing are involved in orthotic manufacture. Orthotics also combines knowledge of anatomy and physiology, pathophysiology, biomechanics and engineering.

In the United States, while orthotists require a prescription from a licensed healthcare provider, physical therapists are not legally authorized to prescribe orthoses. In the U.K., orthotists will often accept referrals from doctors or other healthcare professionals for orthotic assessment without requiring a prescription.

== Prescription and manufacturing ==
Orthoses are offered as:

- Custom-fabricated products – they are in the foreground of an optimal supply and are individually manufactured. If the physical examination of a patient is carried out precisely, the clinical picture often shows a combination of several functional deviations. Each functional deviation can be slight or severe. The combination of the functional deviation and its characteristics leads to a detailed indication. A major advantage of custom-made products is that the various necessary orthotic functions when doing the configuration of the orthotics can be optimally matched to the determined functional deviations. Another advantage of custom-made products is that each orthosis is made to fit the individual body shape of the patient. Custom-fabricated products were traditionally made by following a trace of the extremity with measurements to assist in creating a well-fitted device. Subsequently, the advent of plastics and later even more modern materials such as carbon fiber composites and aramid fibers as materials of choice for construction necessitated the idea of creating a plaster of Paris mold of the body part in question. This method is still extensively used throughout the industry. By introducing composite materials made of carbon fiber materials and aramid fibers embedded in an epoxy resin matrix, the weight of modern orthoses is extremely reduced. With this technique, modern orthoses can achieve perfect stiffness in the areas where this is necessary (e.g., the connection between the ankle and knee joint) and flexibility in the areas where flexibility is required (e.g., in the area of the forefoot on the foot part of an orthosis).
- Semi-finished products – they are used for fast supply in the case of diseases that occur frequently. They are manufactured industrially and in some cases can be adapted to the anatomical body conditions. Semi-finished products are also referred to as prefabricated products and custom fitted products, but in these cases it is not custom-fabricated.
- Finished products – these include short-term orthoses or bandages for a limited duration of therapy and are manufactured industrially. Finished products are also referred to as off-the-shelf products.

Both custom-fabricated products and semi-finished products are used in long-term care and are manufactured or adapted by the orthotist or by trained orthopedic technicians according to the prescription. In many countries the physician or clinician defines the functional deviations in his prescription, e.g. paralysis (paresis) of the calf muscles (triceps surae) and derives the indication from this, e.g. orthotic to restore safety when standing and walking after a stroke. The orthotist creates another detailed physical examination and compares it with the prescription from the physician. The orthotist describes the configuration of the orthosis, which shows which orthotic functions are required to compensate for the functional deviation of the neuromuscular or skeletal system and which functional elements must be integrated into the orthosis for this. Ideally, the necessary orthotic functions and the functional elements to be integrated are discussed in an interdisciplinary team between physician, physical therapist, orthotist and patient.

== Lower limb orthoses ==
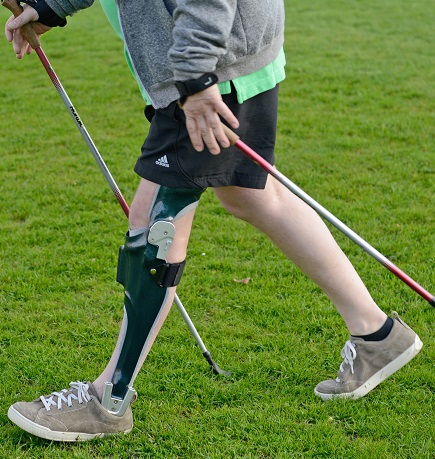
Patient after spinal cord injury with incomplete paraplegia (lesion height L3) with a knee-ankle-foot orthosis with an integrated stance phase control knee joint

All orthoses that affect the foot, the ankle joint, the lower leg, the knee joint, the thigh or the hip joint belong to the category of orthoses for the lower extremities.

=== Paralysis orthoses ===
Paralysis orthoses are used for partial or complete paralysis, as well as complete functional failure of muscles or muscle groups, or incomplete paralysis (paresis). They are intended to correct or improve functional limitations or to replace functions that have been lost as a result of the paralysis. Functional leg length differences caused by paralysis can be compensated for by using orthosis.

For the quality and function of a paralysis orthosis, it is important that the orthotic shell is in total contact with the patient's leg to create an optimal fit, which is why a custom-made orthotic is often preferred. As reducing the weight of an orthosis significantly lessens the energy needed to walk with it, the use of lightweight and highly resilient materials such as carbon fiber, titanium and aluminum is indispensable for the manufacture of a custom-made orthosis.

The production of a custom-made orthotic also allows the integration of orthotic joints, which means the dynamics of the orthotic can be matched exactly with the pivot points of the patient's anatomical joints. As a result, the dynamics of the orthosis take place exactly where dictated by the patient's anatomy. Since the dynamics of the orthosis are executed via the orthotic joints, it is possible to manufacture the orthotic shells as stable and torsion-resistant, which is necessary for the quality and function of the orthosis. The orthosis thus offers the necessary stability to regain the security that has been lost due to paralysis when standing and walking.

In addition, an orthosis can be individually configured through the use of orthosis joints. In this way, the combination of the orthotic joints and the adjustability of the functional elements can be adjusted to compensate for any existing functional deviations that have resulted from the muscle weakness. The goal of a high-quality orthotic fitting is to adjust the functional elements so precisely that the orthosis provides the necessary support while restricting the dynamics of the lower extremities as little as possible to preserve the remaining functionality of the muscles.

==== Determination of strength levels for physical examination ====
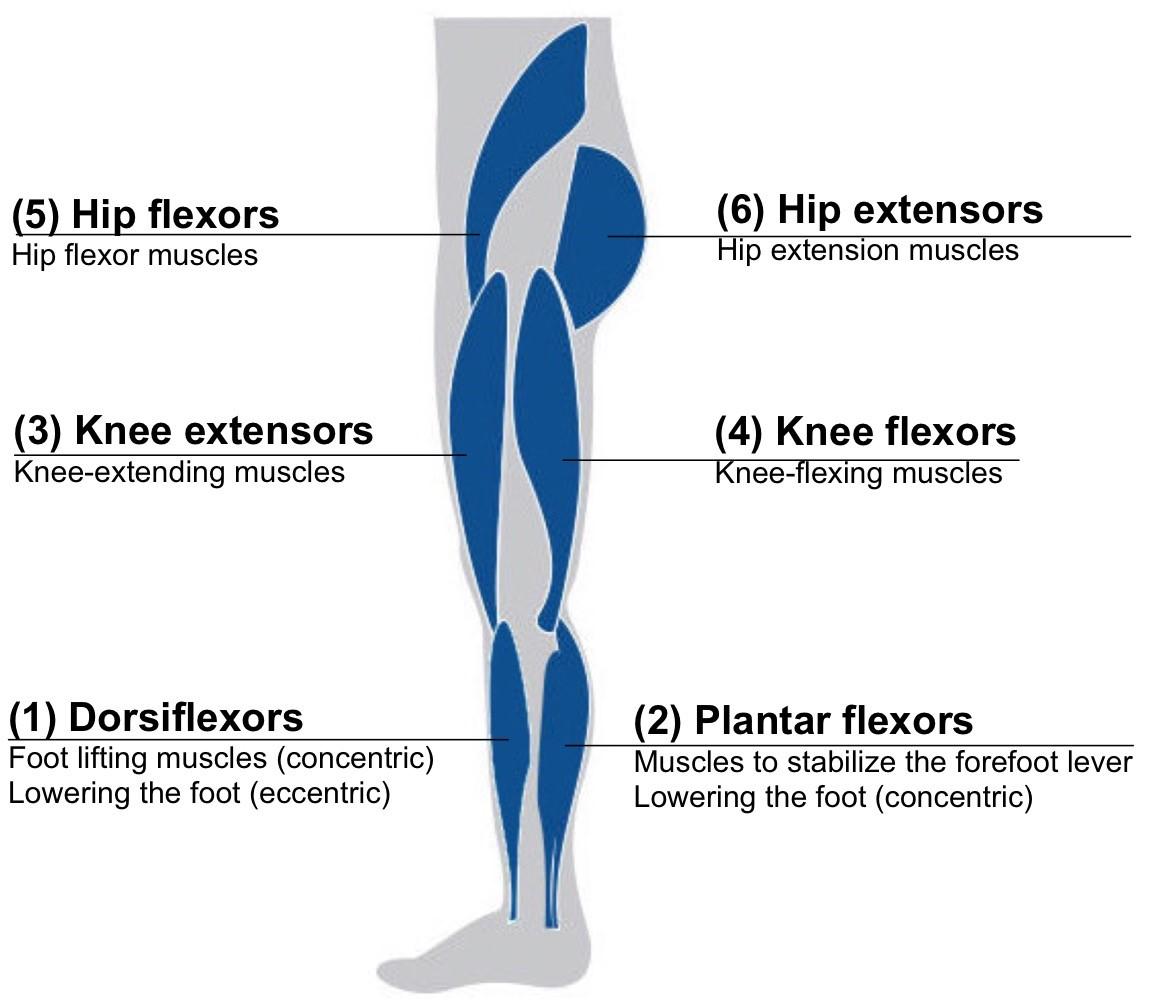
Description of the functions of the large muscle groups used to define the functional elements of a paralysis orthosis intended to compensate for restricted muscle functions

In the case of paralysis due to disease or injury to the spinal/peripheral nervous system, a physical examination is needed to determine the strength levels of the affected leg's six major muscle groups and the orthosis's necessary functions.

1. The dorsiflexors move the foot through concentric muscle work around the axis of the ankle in the direction of dorsiflexion and control the plantar flexion through eccentric muscle work.
2. The plantar flexors contribute significantly to being able to stand upright by actuating the forefoot lever and thereby increasing the standing area when standing. This group of muscles moves the foot in the direction of plantar flexion.
3. The knee extensors extend the knee in the direction of the knee extension.
4. The knee flexors bend the knee in the direction of the knee flexion.
5. The hip flexors bend the hip joint toward the hip flexion.
6. The hip extensors stretch the hip joint in the direction of the hip extension and, at the same time, extend the knee in the direction of the knee extension.

According to Vladimir Janda, a muscle function test is carried out to determine strength levels. The degree of paralysis is given for each muscle group on a scale from 0 to 5, with the value 0 indicating complete paralysis (0%) and the value 5 indicating normal strength (100%). The values between 0 and 5 indicate a percentage reduction in muscle function. All strength levels below five are called muscle weakness.

The combination of strength levels of the muscle groups determines the type of orthosis (AFO or KAFO) and the functional elements necessary to compensate for restrictions caused by the reduced muscular strength levels.

==== Physical examination for paralysis due to diseases or injuries to the spinal cord and/or the peripheral nervous system ====
Paralysis may be caused by injury to the spinal or peripheral nervous system after spinal cord injury, or by diseases such as spina bifida, poliomyelitis and Charcot-Marie-Tooth disease. In these patients, knowledge of the strength levels of the large muscle groups is necessary to configure the orthotic for the necessary functions.

==== Physical examination for paralysis due to diseases or injuries to the central nervous system ====
Paralysis caused by diseases or injuries to the central nervous system (e.g. cerebral palsy, traumatic brain injury, stroke, and multiple sclerosis) can cause incorrect motor impulses that often result in clearly visible deviations in gait. The usefulness of muscle strength tests is therefore limited, as even with high degrees of strength, disturbances to the gait pattern can occur due to the incorrect control of the central nervous system.

===== Cerebral palsy and traumatic brain injury =====
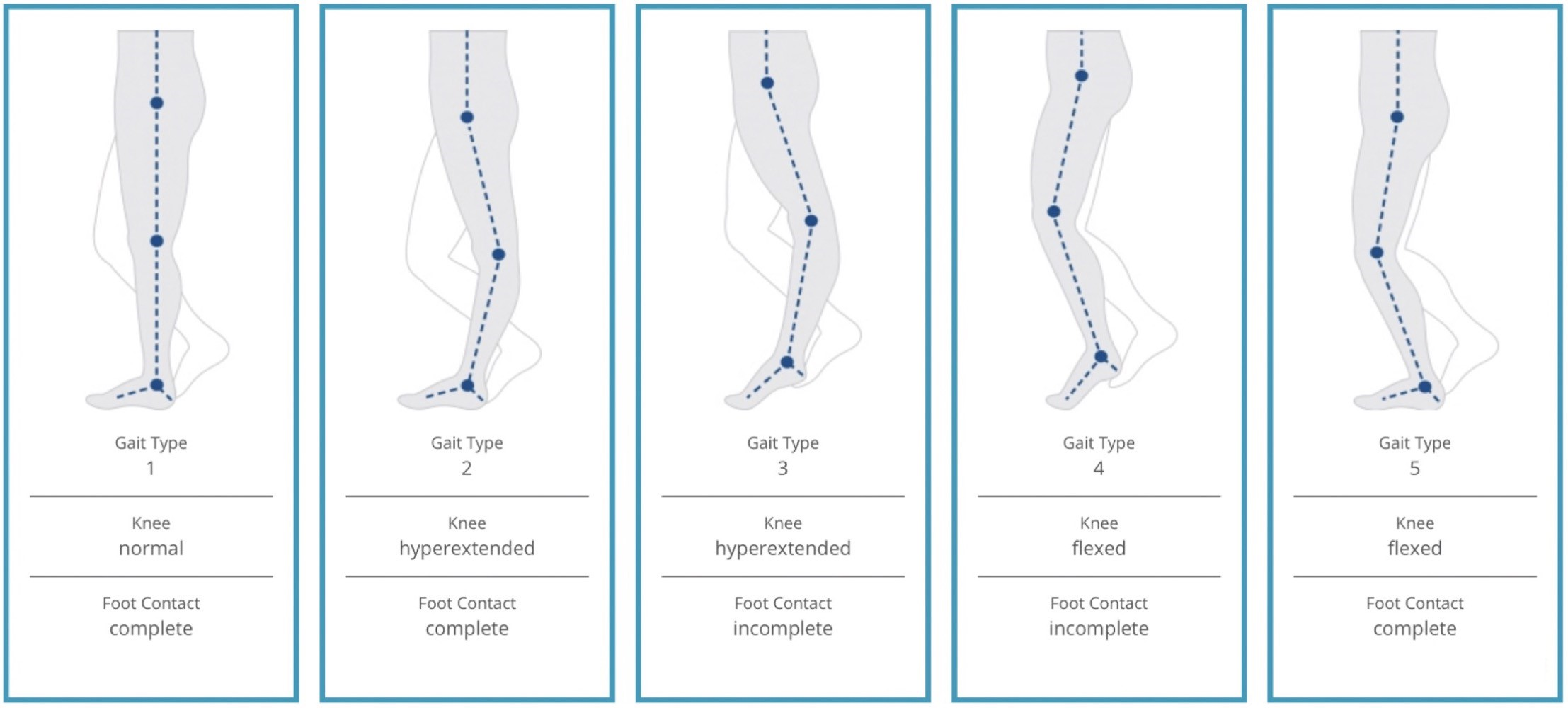
The Amsterdam Gait Classification facilitates the assessment of the gait pattern in CP patients and patients with traumatic brain injury and helps to determine the gait type.

In ambulatory patients with alternative mobility experiences due to cerebral palsy or traumatic brain injury, the gait pattern is analysed as part of the physical examination in order to determine the necessary functions of an orthosis.

One way of classifying gait is according to the "Amsterdam Gait Classification", which describes five gait types. To assess the gait pattern, the patient is viewed directly, or via a video recording, from the side of the leg being assessed. At the point when the leg is mid-stance the knee angle and the contact of the foot with the ground are assessed. The five gait types are:

1. Type 1, the knee angle is normal and foot contact is complete.
2. Type 2, the knee angle is hyperextended and the foot contact is complete.
3. Type 3, the knee angle is hyperextended and foot contact is incomplete (only on the forefoot).
4. Type 4, the knee angle is flexed and foot contact is incomplete (only on the forefoot).
5. Type 5, the knee angle is flexed and foot contact is complete, this is also known as crouch gait.

Patients with paralysis due to cerebral palsy or traumatic brain injury are usually treated with an ankle-foot orthosis (AFO). Although in these patients the muscles are not paralyzed but being sent the wrong impulses from the brain, the functional elements used in the orthotics are the same for both groups. The compensatory gait is an unconscious reaction to the lack of security when standing or walking that usually worsens with increasing age; if the right functional elements are integrated into the orthosis to counter this, and maintain physiological mobility, the right motor impulses are sent to create new cerebral connections. The goal of an orthotic is the best possible approximation of the physiological gait pattern.

===== Stroke =====
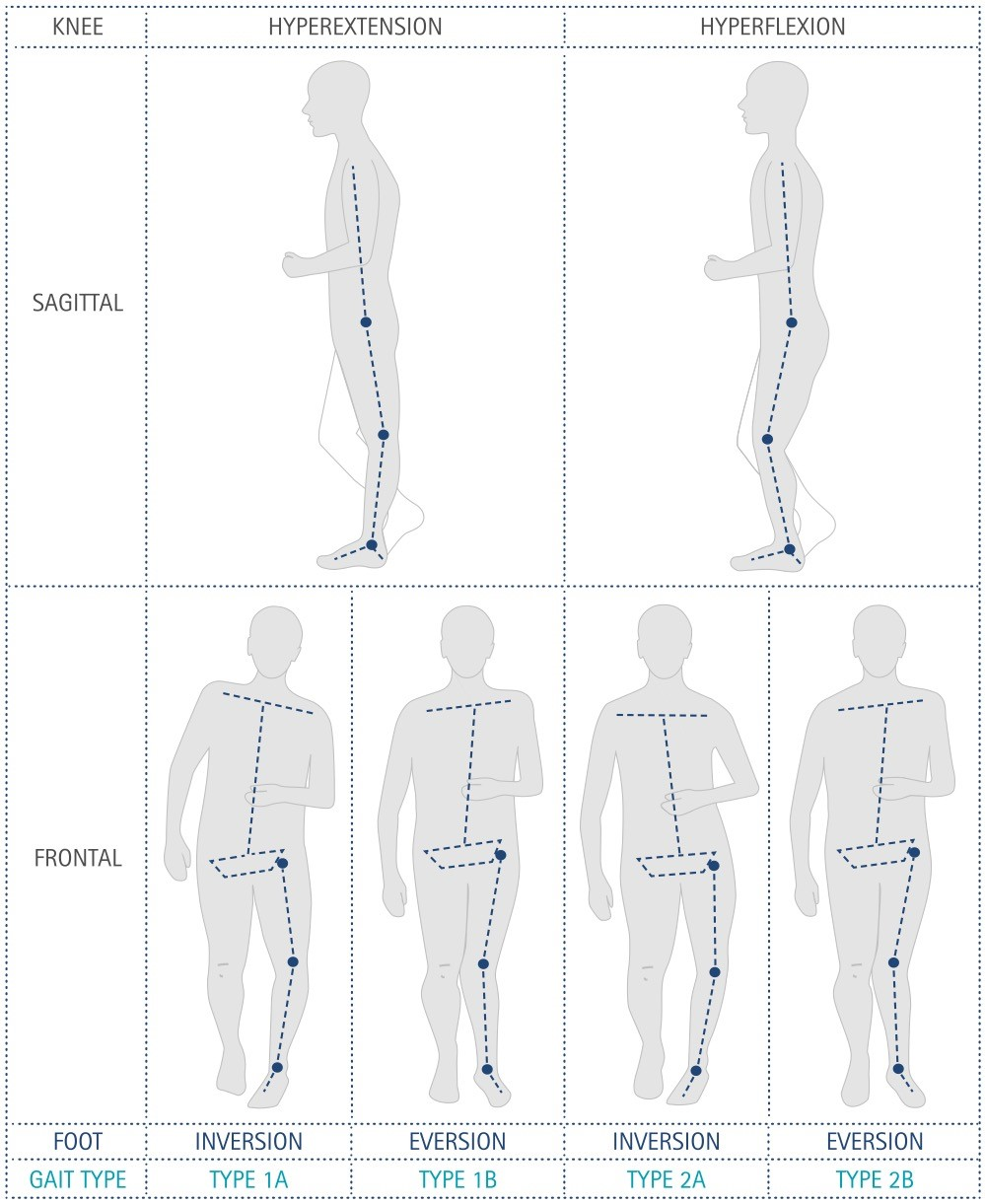
The N.A.P. Gait classification facilitates the assessment of the gait pattern in stroke patients and helps to determine the gait type.

In the case of paralysis after a stroke, rapid care with an orthosis is necessary. Often areas of the brain are affected that contain "programs" for controlling the musculoskeletal system. With the help of an orthosis, physiological standing and walking can be relearned, preventing long term health consequences caused by an abnormal gait pattern. According to Vladimir Janda, when configuring the orthotic it is important to understand that the muscle groups are not paralyzed, but are controlled by the brain with wrong impulses, and this is why a muscle function test can lead to incorrect results when assessing the ability to stand and walk.

An important basic requirement for regaining the ability to walk is that the patient trains early on to stand on both legs safely and well balanced. An orthosis with functional elements to support balance and safety when standing and walking can be integrated into physical therapy from the first standing exercises, and this makes the work of mobilizing the patient at an early stage easier. With the right functional elements that maintain physiological mobility and provide security when standing and walking, the necessary motor impulses to create new cerebral connections can occur. Clinical studies confirm the importance of orthoses in stroke rehabilitation.

Patients with paralysis after a stroke are often treated with an ankle-foot orthosis (AFO), as after a stroke stumbling can occur if only the dorsiflexors are supplied with incorrect impulses from the central nervous system. This can lead to insufficient foot lifting during swing phase of walking, and in these cases, an orthosis that only has functional elements to support the dorsiflexors can be helpful. Such an orthosis is also called drop foot orthosis. When configuring a foot lifter orthosis, adjustable functional elements for setting the resistance can be included, which make it possible to adapt the passive lowering of the forefoot (plantar flexion) to the eccentric work of the dorsal flexors during loading response.

In cases where the muscle group of the plantar flexors is supplied with wrong impulses from the central nervous system, which leads to uncertainty when standing and walking, an unconscious compensatory gait can occur. When configuring an orthosis functional elements that can restore safety when standing and walking must be used in these cases; a foot lifter orthosis is not suitable as it only compensates for the functional deviations caused by weakness of the dorsiflexors.

Patients with paralysis after stroke who are able to walk have the option of analysing the gait pattern in order to determine the optimal function of an orthosis. One way of assessing is the classification according to the "N.A.P. Gait Classification", which is a physiotherapeutic treatment concept. According to this classification, the gait pattern is assessed in the mid-stance phase and described as one of four possible gait types.

This assessment is a two step process; in the first step, the patient is viewed from the side of the leg to be assessed, either directly or via a video recording. In gait type 1 the knee angle is hyperextended, while in type 2, the knee angle is flexed. In the second step, the patient is viewed from the front to determine if the foot is inverted, if it is the letter "a" is added to the gait. This is associated with a varus deformity of the knee. If instead the patient stands on the inner edge of the foot (eversion), which is associated with a valgus deformity of the knee, the letter "b" is added to the gait type. Patients are thus classified as gait types 1a, 1b, 2a or 2b. The goal of orthotic fitting for patients who are able to walk is the best possible approximation of the physiological gait pattern.

===== Multiple sclerosis (MS) =====
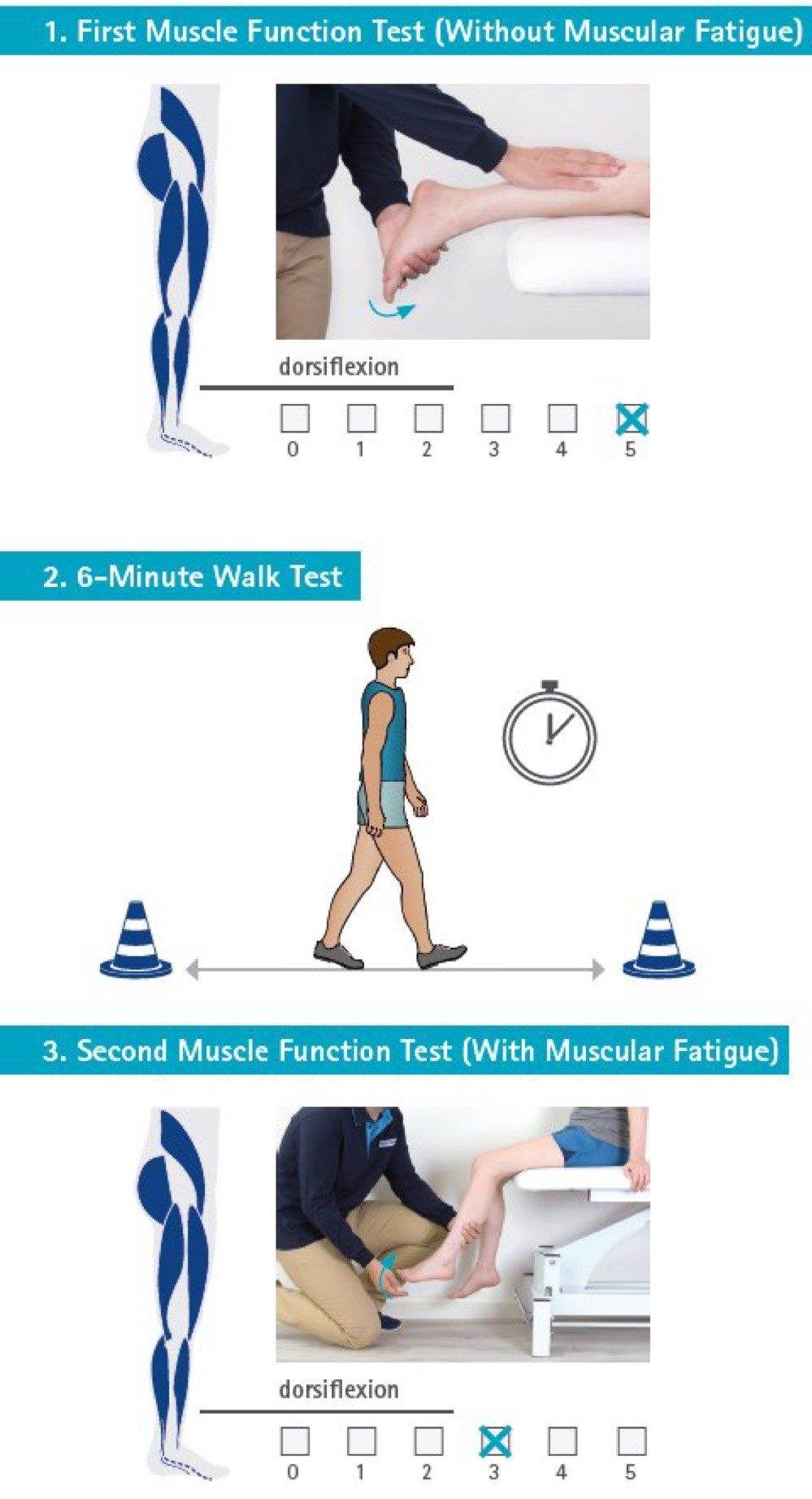
Determination of the strength levels of the large muscle groups, taking into account the muscular fatigue typical of MS patients using the example of the muscle group of the dorsal extensors

In the case of paralysis due to multiple sclerosis, the degree of strength of the six major muscle groups of the affected leg should be determined as part of the physical examination in order to determine the necessary functions of an orthosis, just as in the case of diseases or injuries to the spinal/peripheral nervous system. However, patients with multiple sclerosis may experience muscular fatigue as well. The fatigue can be more or less pronounced and, depending on the severity, can lead to considerable restrictions in everyday life. Persistent stress, such as from walking, causes a deterioration in muscle function and has a significant effect on the spatial and temporal parameters of walking, for example by significantly reducing the cadence and walking speed. Fatigue can be measured as muscle weakness. When determining the strength levels of the six major muscle groups as part of the patient's medical history, fatigue can be taken into account by using a standardized six-minute walking test. According to Vladimir Janda the muscle function test is carried out in combination with the six-minute walk test in the following steps:

1. First muscle function test (without muscular fatigue)
2. Six-minute walk test directly followed by
3. Second muscle function test (with muscular fatigue)

This sequence of muscle function test and six-minute walk test is used to determine whether muscular fatigue can be induced. If the test reveals muscular fatigue, the strength levels and measured fatigue should be included in the planning of an orthosis, and when determining the functional elements.

==== Functional deviations in the case of paralysis of large muscle groups ====
Paralysis of the dorsiflexors – weakness of the dorsiflexors results in a drop foot. The patient's foot cannot be sufficiently lifted during the swing phase while walking, as the necessary concentric work of the dorsiflexors can not be activated. There is a risk of stumbling, and the patient cannot influence the shock absorption when walking (gait phase, loading response), as the eccentric work of the dorsiflexors is limited. After initial heel contact the forefoot either slaps too quickly on the floor via the heel rocker, which creates an audible noise, or the foot does touch the floor with forefoot first, which disrupts gait development.

Paralysis of the plantar flexors – If the plantar flexors are weak, the muscles of the forefoot lever are either inadequately activated or not activated at all. The patient has no balance when standing and has to support themself with aids such as crutches. The forefoot lever required for energy-saving walking in the gait phases from mid-stance to pre-swing cannot be activated by the plantar flexors. This leads to excessive dorsiflexion in the ankle joint in terminal stance and a loss of energy while walking. The center of gravity of the body lowers towards the end of the stance phase and the knee of the contralateral leg is flexed excessively. With each step, the center of gravity must be raised above the leg by straightening the excessively flexed knee. Since the plantar flexors originate above the knee joint, they also have a knee-extension effect in the stance phase.

Paralysis of the knee extensors – if the knee extensors are weak, there is an increased risk of falling when walking, as between loading response to the mid-stance the knee extensors control knee flexion inadequately, or not at all. To control the knee, the patient develops compensatory mechanisms that lead to an incorrect gait pattern, for example by exaggerated activation of the plantar flexors, leading into hyperextension of the knee, or when initial contact is with the forefoot and not the heel in order to prevent the knee-flexing effect of the heel rocker.

Paralysis of the knee flexors – if the knee flexors are weak, it is more difficult to flex the knee in pre-swing.

Paralysis of the hip flexors – if the hip flexors are weak, it is more difficult to flex the knee in pre-swing.

Paralysis of the hip extensors – the hip extensors help control of the knee against unwanted flexion when walking between loading response and mid-stance.

==== Functional elements in paralysis of large muscle groups ====
The functional elements of an orthosis ensure the flexion and extension movements of the ankle, knee and hip joints. They correct and control the movements and secure the joints against undesired incorrect movements, and help avoid falls when standing or walking.

Functional elements in paralysis of the dorsiflexors – if the dorsiflexors are weak, an orthosis should lift the forefoot during the swing phase in order to reduce the risk of the patient stumbling. An orthosis that has only one functional element for lifting the forefoot in order to compensate for a weakness in the dorsiflexors is also known as a drop foot orthosis. An AFO of the drop foot orthosis type is therefore not suitable for the care of patients with weakness in other muscle groups, as these patients require additional functional elements to be taken into account. Initial contact with the heel should be achieved by lifting the foot through the orthosis, and if the dorsiflexors are very weak, control of the rapid drop of the forefoot should be taken over by dynamic functional elements that allow for adjustable resistance of plantar flexion. Orthoses should be adapted to the functional deviation of the dorsiflexors in order to correct the shock absorption of the heel rocker lever during loading response, but should not block plantar flexion of the ankle joint as this leads to excessive flexion in the knee and hip and an increase in the energy needed for walking. This is why static functional elements are not recommended when there are newer technical alternatives.

Functional elements in paralysis of the plantar flexors – in order to compensate for a weakness of the plantar flexors, the orthosis has to transfer large forces that the strong muscle group would otherwise take over. These forces are transmitted in a similar way to a ski boot during downhill skiing via the functional elements of the foot part, ankle joint and lower leg shell. Dynamic functional elements are preferable for the ankle joint as static functional elements would completely block the dorsiflexion, which would have to be compensated for by the upper body, resulting in an increased energy cost when walking. The functional element's resistance to protect against unwanted dorsiflexion should be able to be adapted according to the weakness of the plantar flexors. In the case of very weak plantar flexors, the functional element's resistance against undesired dorsiflexion must be very high in order to compensate for the functional deviations this causes. Adjustable functional elements allow the resistance to be adjusted exactly to the weakness of the muscle, and scientific studies recommend adjustable resistance in patients with paralysis or weakness of the plantar flexors.

Functional elements in paralysis of knee extensors and hip extensors – in the case of weak knee extensors or hip extensors, the orthosis must take over the stability and stance phase control when walking. Different knee-securing functional elements are needed depending on the weakness of these muscles. In order to compensate for functional deviations with slightly weakness of these muscle groups, a free moving mechanical knee joint with the mechanical pivot point behind the anatomical knee pivot point can be sufficient. In the case of significant weakness, knee flexion when walking must be controlled by functional elements that mechanically secure the knee joint during the early stance phases between loading response and mid stance. Stance phase control knee joints which lock the knee in the early stance phases and release it for knee flexion during the swing phase can be used here, with these joints, a natural gait pattern can be achieved despite mechanically securing against unwanted knee flexion. In these cases, locked knee joints are often used, and while they have a good safety function, the knee joint remains mechanically locked during the swing phase while walking. Patients with locked knee joints have to manage the swing phase with a stiff leg, which only works if the patient develops compensatory mechanisms, such as by raising the body's center of gravity in the swing phase (Duchenne limping) or by swinging the orthotic leg to the side (circumduction). Stance phase control knee joints and locked joints can both be mechanically "unlocked" so the knee can be flexed to sit down.

===== Ankle–foot orthoses (AFO) in the field of paralysis orthoses =====
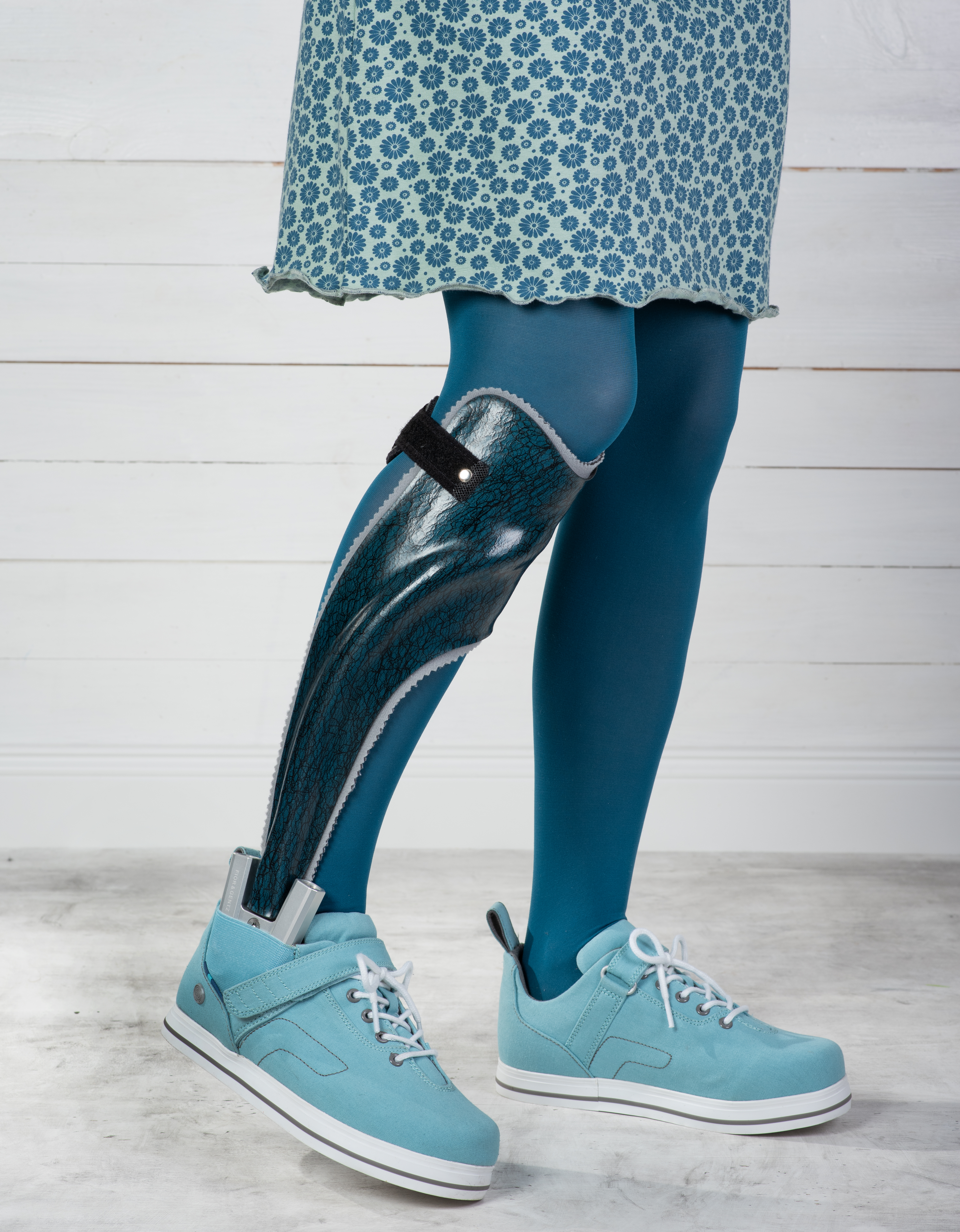
Ankle-foot orthosis for the care of patients after stroke, cerebral palsy, multiple sclerosis and other paralyzes of the dorsiflexors and plantar flexors. Designation of the orthosis according to the body parts included in the orthosis fitting: ankle and foot, English abbreviation: AFO for ankle-foot orthoses.

AFO is the abbreviation for ankle-foot orthoses, which is the English name for an orthosis that spans the ankle and foot. In the treatment of paralyzed patients, they are mainly used when there is a weakness of the dorsiflexors or plantar flexors.

Through the use of modern materials, such as carbon fibers and aramid fibers, and new knowledge about processing these materials into composite materials, the weight of orthotics has been reduced significantly. In addition to the weight reduction, these materials and technologies have created the possibility of making some areas of an orthosis so rigid that it can take over the forces of the weakened muscles (e.g. the connection from the ankle joint to the frontal contact surface on the shin), while at the same time leaving areas requiring less support very flexible (e.g. the flexible part of the forefoot).

It is now possible to combine the required rigidity of the orthotic shells with the dynamics in the ankle, with this, other new technologies, and the possibility of producing lightweight but rigid orthoses, new demands have been made of orthotics:

- Despite the necessary rigidity, the orthoses should not block the mobility of the ankle.
- Despite the necessary rigidity, the orthoses should not block the functionality of the muscles, but rather promote it.
- Despite the necessary rigidity, contractures and spasticity should not be stimulated.

A custom-made AFO can compensate for functional deviations of muscle groups, it should be configured according to the patient data through a function and load calculation so that it meets the functional and load requirements. In calculating or configuring an AFO, variants are optimally matched to individual requirements for the functional elements of the ankle joint, for the stiffness of the foot shell, and for the shape of the lower leg shell. The size of these components is selected by matching their resilience to the load data.

An ankle joint based on new technology is the connection between the foot shell and the lower leg shell and at the same time contains all the necessary adjustable functional elements of an AFO.

Depending on the combination of the degree of paralysis of the dorsiflexors or plantar flexors, different functional elements to compensate for their weakness can be integrated into the ankle joint; if both muscle groups are affected, the elements should be integrated into one orthotic joint. The necessary dynamics and resistance to movements in the ankle can be adapted via adjustable functional elements in the ankle joint of the orthosis, which allows it to compensate for muscle weaknesses, provide safety when standing and walking, and still allow as much mobility as possible. For example, adjustable spring units with pre-compression can enable an exact adaptation of both static and dynamic resistance to the measured degree of muscle weakness. Studies show the positive effects of these new technologies. It is of great advantage if the resistances for these two functional elements can be set separately.

An AFO with functional elements to compensate for a weakness of the plantar flexors can also be used for slight weakness of the knee-securing muscle groups, the knee extensors and the hip extensors.

A drop foot orthosis is an AFO that only has one functional element for lifting the forefoot in order to compensate for a weakness in the dorsiflexors. If other muscle groups, such as the plantar flexors, are weak, additional functional elements must be taken into account, making a drop foot orthosis unsuitable for patients with weakness in other muscle groups.

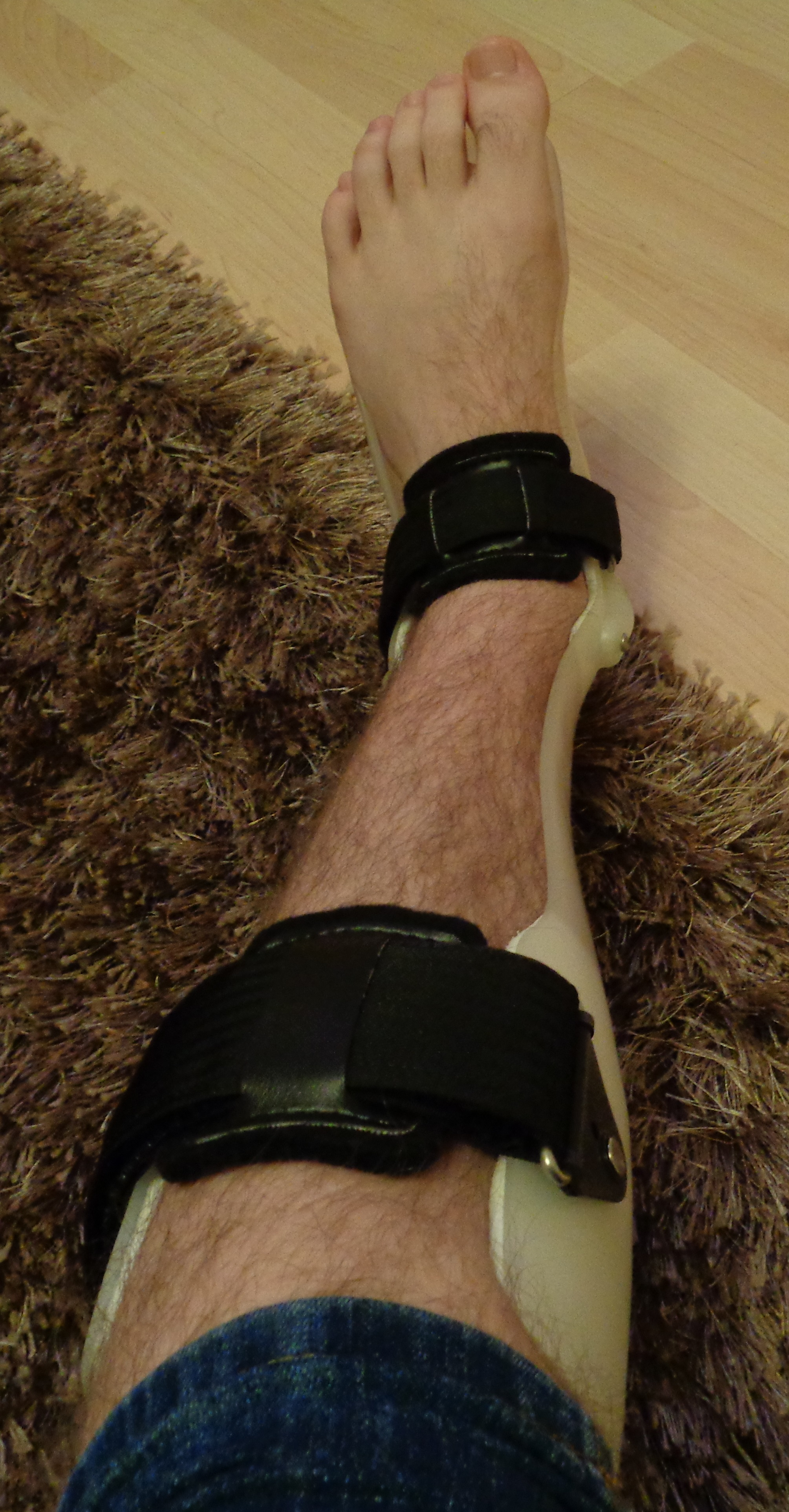
Ankle-foot orthosis (AFO) manufactured using old technology from polypropylene in a variant that is also called "hinged AFO". It can be used to support an isolated foot drop, but it will block plantar flexion. This AFO cannot transmit the high forces required to counterbalance weak plantar flexors while standing and walking.

In 2006, before these new technologies were available, the International Committee of the Red Cross published in its 2006 Manufacturing Guidelines for Ankle-Foot Orthoses, with the aim of providing people with disabilities worldwide standardized processes for the production of high-quality, modern, durable and economical devices.

Because new technologies are not widely used, AFOs are often made from polypropylene-based plastic, mostly in the shape of a continuous "L" shape, with the upright part behind the calf and the lower part under the foot, but this only offers the rigidity of the material. AFOs made of polypropylene are still called "DAFO" (dynamic ankle-foot orthosis), "SAFO" (solid ankle-foot orthosis) or "hinged AFO". DAFOs are not stable enough to transfer the high forces required to balance the weak plantar flexors when standing and walking, and SAFOs block the mobility of the ankle joint. A "hinged AFO" only allowed for the compensation that could be achieved with the orthotic joints of the time, for example, they commonly block plantar flexion, as the joints cannot simultaneously transmit the large forces that are required to compensate for muscle deviations while also offering the necessary dynamics.

While there was a multitude of AFOs with differing designs in clinical practice, there was also a clear lack of details regarding the design and the materials used for manufacture, leading Eddison and Chockalingam to call for a new standardization of the terminology. With a focus on caring for children with cerebral palsy there is a recommendation to investigate the potential for gait pattern improvement via the design and manufacture of orthotics made of polypropylene. On the other hand, integrating orthotic joints with modern functional elements into the production of older technologies using polypropylene is unusual because the orthotic shells made of polypropylene either could not transfer the high forces or would be too soft.

New studies now show the better possibilities for improving the gait pattern through the new technologies.

The International Committee of the Red Cross published its manufacturing guidelines for ankle–foot orthoses in 2006, and, unfortunately, today's terminologies are still based those guidelines and therefore require a particularly high level of explanation. The intent was to provide standardized procedures for the manufacture of high-quality modern, durable and economical devices to people with disabilities throughout the world. However, with the new technologies available, the main types mentioned are in need of revision today.

AFO known as: SAFO	Designation of the orthosis according to one function: S for solid plus the body parts included in the orthosis fitting: ankle and foot, English abbreviation: AFO for ankle-foot orthoses "SAFO"	Designation given by the Red Cross in 2006: Rigid AFO	Provides functional elements against a drop foot and for stabilization when standing; Blocks both plantar flexion and dorsiflexion, with all negative consequences; Alignment not adjustable; Stiffness in plantarflexion not adjustable; Stiffness in dorsiflexion not adjustable
AFO known as: DAFO	Designation of the orthosis according to one function: D for dynamic plus the body parts included in the orthosis fitting: ankle and foot, English abbreviation: AFO for ankle-foot orthoses "DAFO"	Designation given by the Red Cross in 2006: Flexible AFO	Provides a functional element against a drop foot.; Does not provide safety when standing and walking if the plantar flexors are weak; Alignment not adjustable; Resistance in plantarflexion not adjustable; Resistance in dorsiflexion not adjustable
AFO known as: Hinged AFO	Designation of the orthosis according to one function: Hinged plus the body parts included in the orthosis fitting: ankle and foot, English abbreviation: AFO for ankle-foot orthoses "Hinged-AFO" "Hinged" simply means a flexible connection between the two parts of the orthosis. The joint itself does not offer any further functional elements.	Designation given by the Red Cross in 2006: AFO with Tamarack Flexure Joint	Provides a functional element against a drop foot; Does not provide safety when standing and walking if the plantar flexors are weak; Blocks plantar flexion with all negative consequences; Alignment not adjustable; Stiffness in plantarflexion not adjustable; Resistance in dorsiflexion not adjustable
AFO known as: posterior leaf spring	Designation of the orthosis according to one function: "posterior leaf spring" Spring made from flexible material behind (posterior) the ankle A DAFO often also known as "Posterior Leaf Spring"	Not mentioned by the Red Cross in 2006	Provides functional elements against a drop foot.; Stabilization when standing and walking for weak plantar flexors with energy return; Provides dynamics in the ankle but prevents the physiological plantar flexion caused by the heel lever, as the movement of the orthosis takes place behind the ankle joint; Alignment not adjustable; Stiffness in plantarflexion not adjustable; Stiffness in dorsiflexion not adjustable
AFO known as: FRAFO	Designation of the orthosis according to one function: FR for floor reaction plus the body parts included in the orthosis fitting: ankle and foot, English abbreviation: AFO for ankle-foot orthoses "FRAFO" Designation is misleading as other orthoses also have this function	Not mentioned by the Red Cross in 2006	Provides functional elements against a drop foot.; Stabilization when standing and walking for weak plantar flexors.; Blocks both plantar flexion and dorsiflexion, with all negative consequences; Alignment not adjustable; Resistance in plantarflexion not adjustable; Resistance in dorsiflexion not adjustable
AFO with stiff carbon fiber frame and dynamic ankle joint for adjustable stiffness through separately adjustable spring resistance in plantar- and dorsiflexion	Designation of the orthosis according to the body parts included in the orthosis fitting: ankle and foot, English abbreviation: AFO for ankle-foot orthoses. Plus further descriptions, such as: ventral shell with torsionally rigid reinforcement to focus the dynamics on the ankle joint; dynamic ankle joint with precompressed spring elements to control plantarflexion and dorsiflexion	Not mentioned by the Red Cross in 2006	Depending on which functional elements are integrated in the ankle joint used, such an orthosis can enable the following functions: provides dynamics in the ankle; Adjustable alignment; Adjustable resistance for shock absorption during loading response; Adjustable resistance to prevent drop foot; Adjustable resistance for stabilization when standing and walking for weak plantar flexors with energy return

===== Knee-ankle-foot orthosis (KAFO) in the field of paralysis orthoses =====
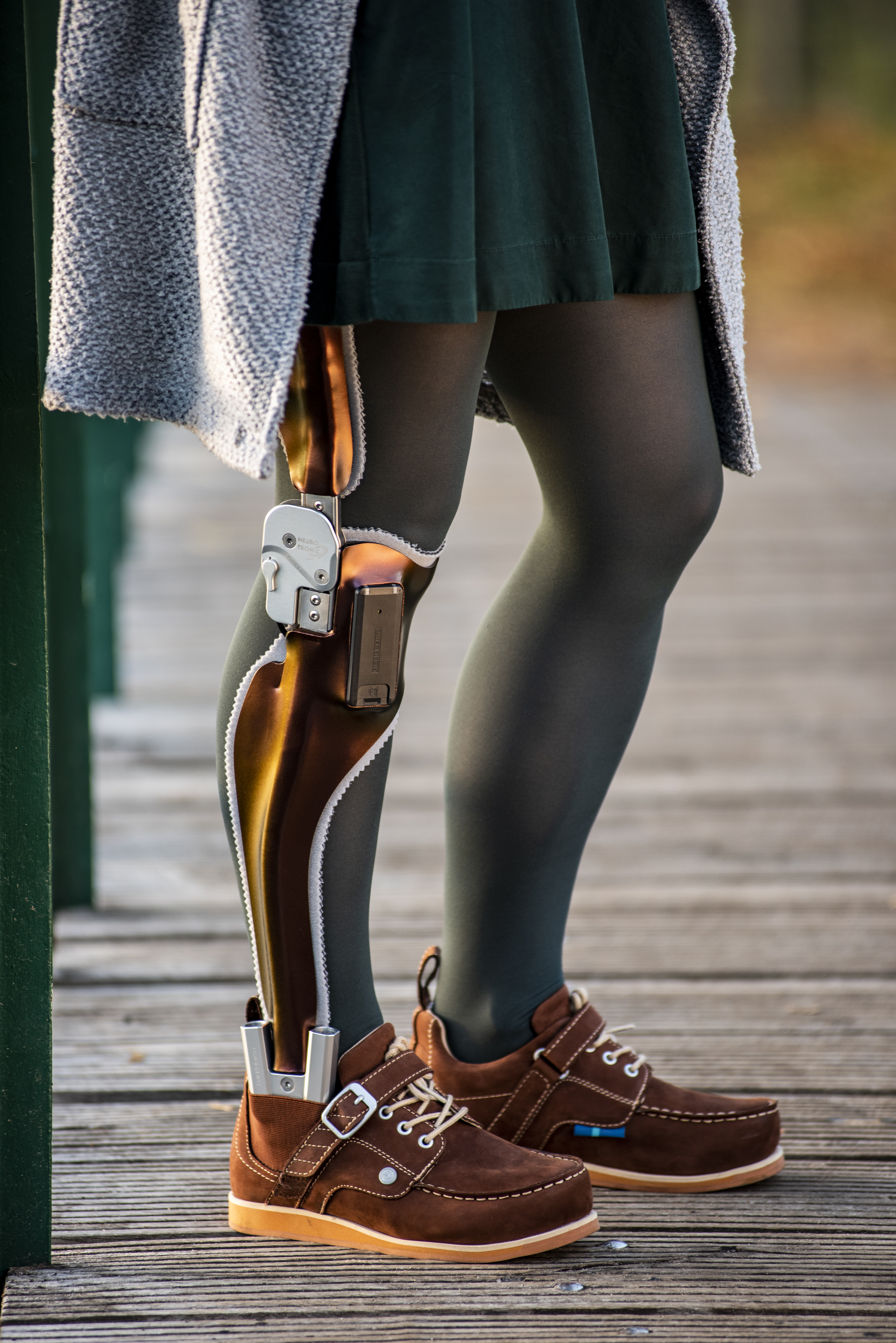
Knee-ankle-foot orthosis for the treatment of patients e.g. with paraplegia after spinal cord injury, poliomyelitis or multiple sclerosis. Designation of the orthosis according to the body parts included in the orthosis fitting: knee, ankle and foot, English abbreviation: KAFO for knee-ankle-foot orthoses.

KAFO is the abbreviation for knee-ankle-foot orthoses, which spans the knee, ankle and foot. In the treatment of paralyzed patients, a KAFO is used when there is a weakness of the knee or hip extensors. They have two orthotic joints: an ankle joint between the foot and lower leg shells and a knee joint between the lower leg and thigh shells.

KAFOs can be roughly divided into three variants, depending on whether the mechanical knee joint is: locked, unlocked or locked and unlocked.

KAFO with locked knee joint: The mechanical knee joint is locked both when standing and also when walking (in both the stance and swing phases) in order to achieve the necessary stability. To sit, the user can unlock the knee joint. When walking with a locked knee joint it is difficult for the user to swing the leg forward and, in order to not stumble, the leg must be swung forward and out in a circular arc (circumduction) or the hip must be raised unnaturally to swing the stiff leg. Each of these incorrect gait patterns can lead to secondary diseases in the bone and muscle system, and such compensatory movement patterns lead to increased energy consumption when walking. The film Forrest Gump impressively shows how the main character Forrest Gump is additionally hindered in his urge to move by such orthoses. For centuries, KAFOs were built with mechanical knee joints that stiffened the knee of the paralyzed leg, and even today, such orthotic fittings are still common. Typical designations for a KAFO with a locked knee joint include "KAFO with Swiss lock" or "KAFO with drop lock lock".

KAFO with unlocked knee joint: An unlocked knee joint can move freely both when standing and when walking, both in the stance phase and in the swing phase. In order for the leg to swing through without stumbling, knee flexion of approximately 60° is allowed; the user does not need to unlock the knee joint to sit. As a KAFO with an unlocked knee joint can provide only minor compensation for paralysis-related issues while standing and walking, an orthotic knee joint with a rearward displacement of the pivot point can be installed in order to increase safety. However, even with this, a KAFO with a non-locked knee joint should only be used in cases of minor paralysis of the knee and hip extensors. With more severe paralysis and low levels of strength in these muscle groups, there is a significant risk of falling. A typical designation for a KAFO with a unlocked knee joint is, among other things, "KAFO with knee joint for movement control".

KAFO with locked and unlocked knee joint: The mechanical knee joint of a KAFO with locked and unlocked knee joint is locked when walking in the stance phase, providing the necessary stability and security for the user. The knee joint is then automatically unlocked in the swing phase, allowing the leg to be swung through without stumbling. In order to be able to walk efficiently, without stumbling, and without compensating mechanisms, the joint should allow knee flexion of approximately 60° in the swing phase. The first promising developments of automatic knee joints, or stance phase locking knee joints, emerged in the 1990s. In the beginning there were automatic mechanical constructions that took over the locking and unlocking, now automatic electromechanical and automatic electrohydraulic systems are available that make standing and walking safer and more comfortable. Various terms are used for a KAFO with a locked and unlocked knee joint. Typical designations are "KAFO with automatic knee joint" or "KAFO with stance phase control knee joint". In scientific articles, the English term "stance control orthosis" (SCO) is often used, but as this term differs from the ICS classification, one of the first two terms is preferable.

Different functional elements to compensate for weakness of the dorsiflexors or plantar flexors can be integrated into the ankle joint of the orthosis depending on the degree of paralysis of the two muscle groups. It is of great advantage if the resistances for these two functional elements can be set separately. The functional elements to compensate for paralysis of the knee-securing muscle groups of the knee and hip extensors are integrated into the knee joint of the orthosis via knee-securing functional elements. A KAFO can use a variety of combinations of different variants in the stiffness of the foot shell, the different variants of the functional elements of a dynamic ankle joint, the variants in the shape of the lower leg shell, and the functional elements of a knee joint to compensate for the user's limitations.

===== Hip-knee-ankle-foot orthosis (HKAFO) in the field of paralysis orthoses =====
HKAFO is the abbreviation for hip-knee-ankle-foot orthoses; which is the English name for an orthosis that spans the hip, the knee, the ankle and the foot. In the treatment of paralyzed patients, a HKAFO is used when there is a weakness of the pelvic stabilizing trunk muscles.

=== Relief orthoses ===
Relief orthoses are used when there is degeneration to a joint (from "wear and tear" for example) or after an injury such as a torn ligament. Relief orthoses are also used after operations such as operations on the joint ligaments, other bony, muscular structures, or after a complete replacement of a joint.

Relief orthosis may also be used to:

- Control, guide, limit and/or immobilize an extremity, joint or body segment for a particular reason
- Restrict movement in a given direction
- Assist movement generally
- Reduce weight-bearing forces for a particular purpose
- Aid rehabilitation from fractures after the removal of a cast
- Otherwise correct the shape and/or function of the body, to provide easier movement capability or reduce pain

==== Ulcer healing orthoses (UHO) ====
A custom-made ankle/foot orthosis can be used for the treatment of patients with foot ulcers, it is a rigid L-shaped support member with a rigid anterior support shell on an articulated hinge. The plantar portion of the L-shaped member has at least one ulcer-protecting hollow to allow the user to transfer their weight away from the ulcer to facilitate treatment. The anterior support shell is designed with a lateral hinged attachment to take advantage of the medial tibial flare structure to enhance the weight-bearing properties of the orthosis. A flexible, polyethylene hinge attaches the support shell to the L-shaped member and straps securely attach the anterior support shell to the user's lower leg.

==== Foot orthoses (FO) ====
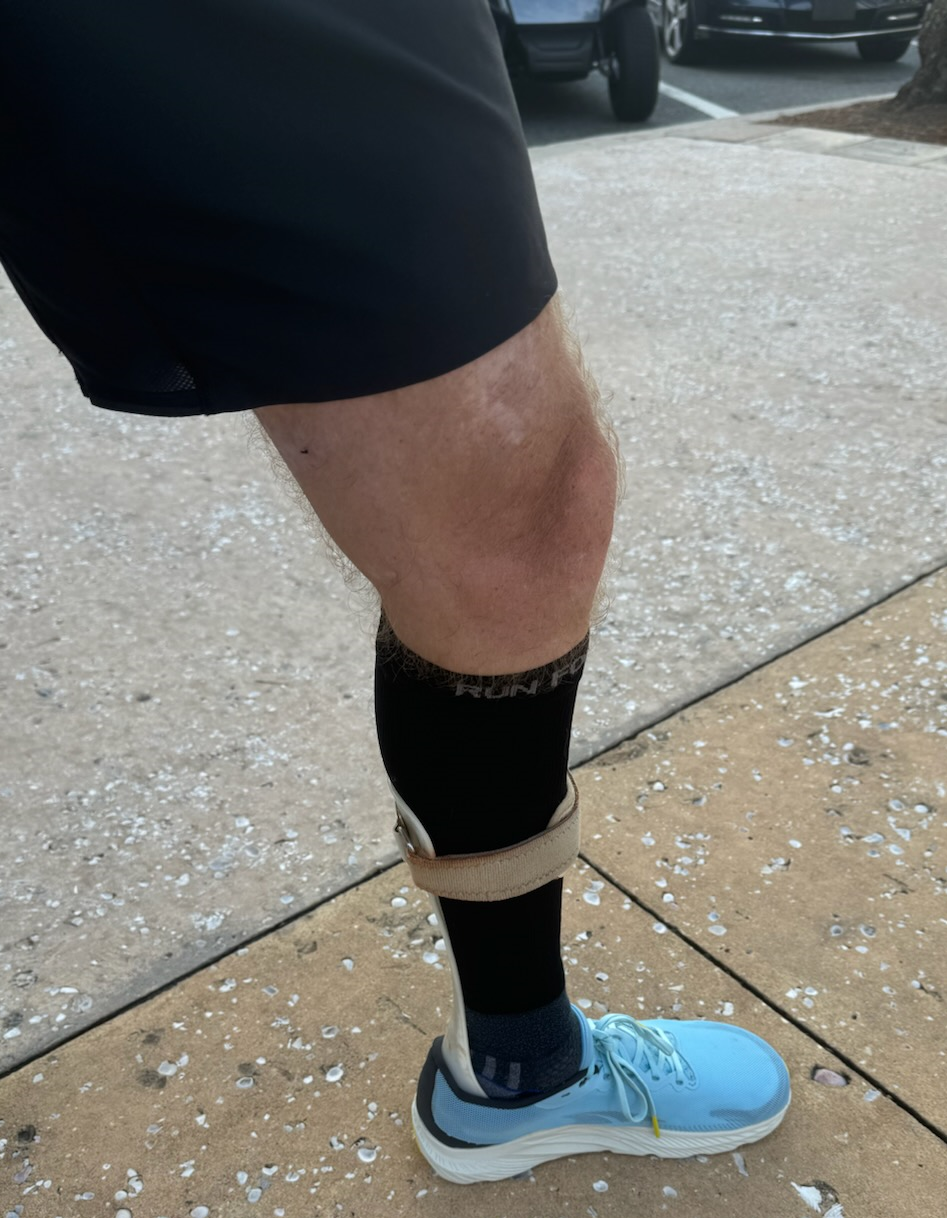
A custom ankle-foot orthotic (AFO) specifically designed and fabricated based on a runner's individual foot and ankle anatomy and biomechanics

Foot orthoses (commonly called orthotics) are devices inserted into shoes to provide support for the foot by redistributing ground reaction forces acting on the foot joints while standing, walking or running. They may be either pre-moulded (also called pre-fabricated) or custom made according to a cast or impression of the foot. They are used by everyone from athletes to the elderly to accommodate biomechanical deformities and a variety of soft tissue conditions. Foot orthoses are effective at reducing pain for people with painful high-arched feet, and may be effective for people with rheumatoid arthritis, plantar fasciitis, first metatarsophalangeal (MTP) joint pain or hallux valgus (bunions). For children with juvenile idiopathic arthritis (JIA) custom-made and pre-fabricated foot orthoses may also reduce foot pain. Foot orthoses may also be used in conjunction with properly fitted orthopedic footwear in the prevention of diabetic foot ulcers. A real-time weight bearing orthotic can be created using a neutral position casting device and the Vertical Foot Alignment System VFAS.

==== Ankle–foot orthoses (AFO) in the field of relief orthoses ====
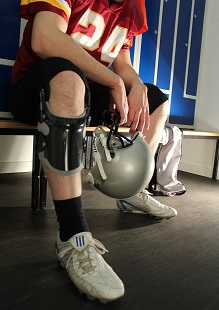
Knee orthosis with toothed gear segment joints for the care of patients e.g. after a cruciate ligament tear. Designation of the orthosis according to the body parts included in the orthosis fitting: the knee, English abbreviation: KO for knee orthoses.

An AFO can also be used to immobilize the ankle and lower leg in the presence of arthritis or a fracture. Ankle–foot orthoses are the most commonly used orthoses, making up about 26% of all orthoses provided in the United States. According to a review of Medicare payments from 2001 to 2006, the base cost of an AFO was about $500 to $700.

==== Knee orthoses (KO) in the field of relief orthoses ====
A knee orthosis (KO) or knee brace extends above and below the knee joint and is generally worn to support or align the knee. In the case of diseases causing neurological or muscular impairment of muscles surrounding the knee, a KO can prevent flexion, extension, or instability of the knee. If the ligaments or cartilage of the knee are affected, a KO can provide stabilization to the knee by replacing their functions. For instance, knee braces can be used to relieve pressure from diseases such as arthritis or osteoarthritis by realigning the knee joint. In this way a KO may help reduce osteoarthritis pain, however, there is no clear evidence about the most effective orthosis or the best approach to rehabilitation. A knee brace is not meant to treat an injury or disease on its own, but is used as a component of treatment along with drugs, physical therapy and possibly surgery. When used properly, a knee brace may help an individual to stay active by enhancing the position and movement of the knee or reducing pain.

==== Prophylactic, functional and rehabilitation braces ====
Prophylactic braces are used primarily by athletes participating in contact sports. Evidence indicates that prophylactic knee braces, like the ones American football linemen wear that are often rigid with a knee hinge, are ineffective in reducing anterior cruciate ligament tears, but may be helpful in resisting medial and lateral collateral ligament tears.

Functional braces are designed for use by people who have already experienced a knee injury and need support while recovering from it, or to help people who have pain associated with arthritis. They are intended to reduce the rotation of the knee, support stability, reduce the chance of hyperextension, and increase the agility and strength of the knee. The majority of these are made of elastic. They are the least expensive of all braces and are easily found in a variety of sizes.

Rehabilitation braces are used to limit the movement of the knee in both medial and lateral directions, these braces often have an adjustable range of motion, and can be used to limit flexion and extension following ACL reconstruction. They are primarily used after injury or surgery to immobilize the leg and are larger in size than other braces, due to their function.

=== Soft braces ===
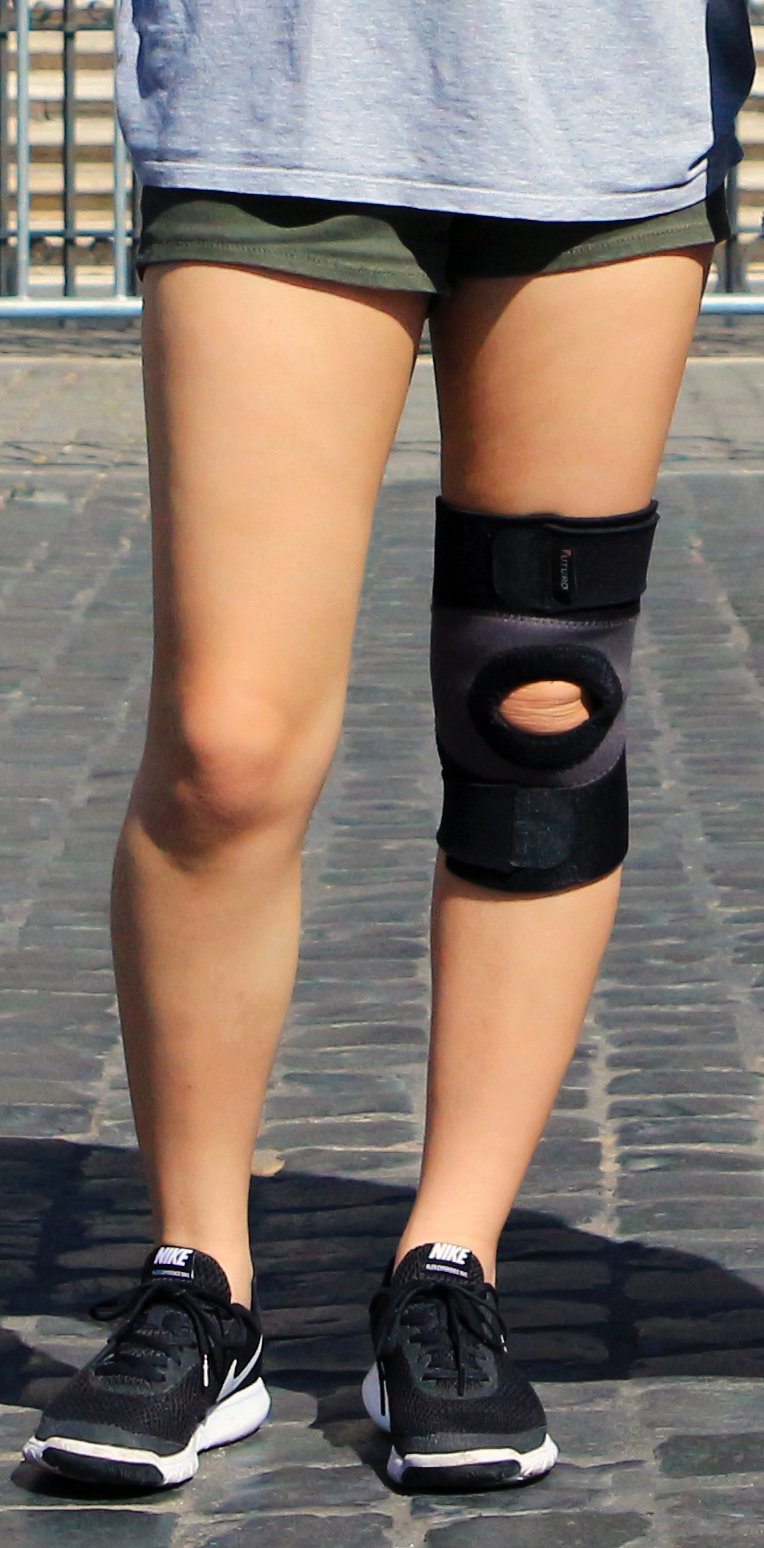
Knee bandage/Knee brace

A soft brace, sometimes called soft support or a bandage, belong to the field of orthoses and are supposed to protect the joints from excessive loads. Soft braces are also classified according to regions of the body. In sport, bandages are used to protect bones and joints, and prevent and protect injuries. Bandages should also allow proprioception. They mostly consist of textiles, some of which have supportive elements. The supporting functions are low compared to paralysis and relief orthoses, though they are sometimes used prophylactically or to optimize performance in sport. At present, the scientific literature does not provide sufficient high quality research to allow for strong conclusions on their effectiveness and cost-effectiveness.

== Upper limb orthoses ==
Upper-limb (or upper extremity) orthoses are mechanical or electromechanical devices applied externally to the arm, or segments of it, in order to restore or improve function or structural characteristics of the arm segments enclosed in the device. In general, musculoskeletal problems that may be alleviated by the use of upper limb orthoses include those resulting from trauma or disease (arthritis for example). They may also benefit individuals who have a neurological impairment from a stroke, spinal cord injury, or peripheral neuropathy.

=== Types of upper-limb orthoses ===
- Upper-limb orthoses
  - Clavicular and shoulder orthoses
  - Arm orthoses
  - Functional arm orthoses
  - Elbow orthoses
- Forearm-wrist orthoses
- Forearm-wrist-thumb orthoses
- Forearm-wrist-hand orthoses
- Hand orthoses
- Upper-extremity orthoses (with special functions)

==== Spinal orthoses ====
Spinal orthoses are externally applied medical devices designed to support, align, prevent, or correct deformities of the spine and to improve spinal function. They are commonly prescribed in the management of spinal conditions affecting the cervical, thoracic, lumbar, or sacral regions. Spinal orthoses play a significant role in rehabilitation, injury management, and long-term care for individuals with musculoskeletal and neurological disorders. Spinal orthoses are classified according to the anatomical region they support. Cervical orthoses, such as soft collars and rigid cervical braces, are used to limit neck movement, reduce pain, and provide stabilization following trauma, surgery, or degenerative conditions. Thoracolumbosacral orthoses (TLSOs) are commonly prescribed for conditions such as scoliosis, kyphosis, vertebral fractures, and post-operative spinal stabilization. Lumbosacral orthoses (LSOs) provide support to the lower back and are often used in cases of chronic low back pain, disc herniation, and lumbar instability. One of the most important applications of spinal orthoses is in the conservative management of spinal deformities, particularly scoliosis in children and adolescents. Scoliosis braces, such as the Boston brace and Milwaukee brace, aim to prevent progression of spinal curvature during growth by applying corrective forces in three planes: coronal, sagittal, and transverse. Early detection and timely orthotic intervention can significantly reduce the need for surgical treatment.

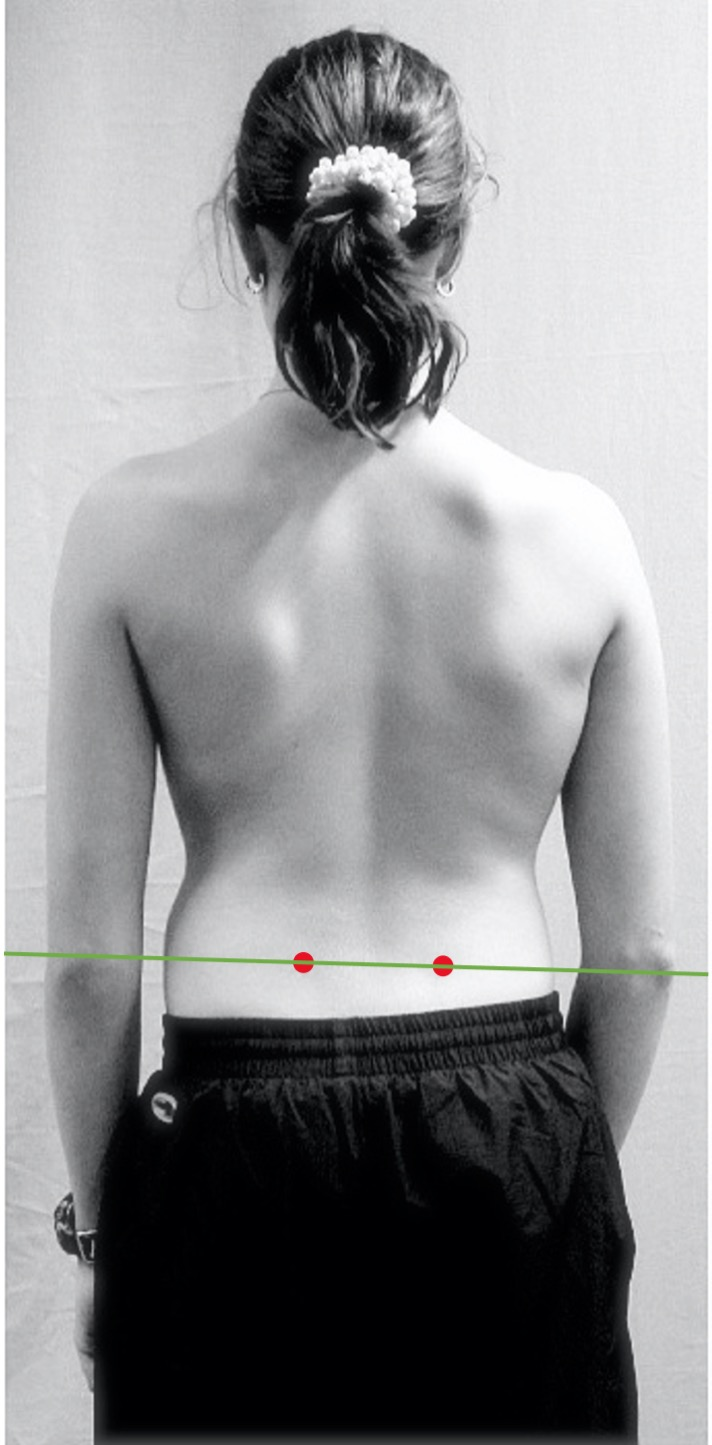
Measurement of pelvic tilt during physical examination to determine whether spinal orthoses are indicated to treat scoliosis

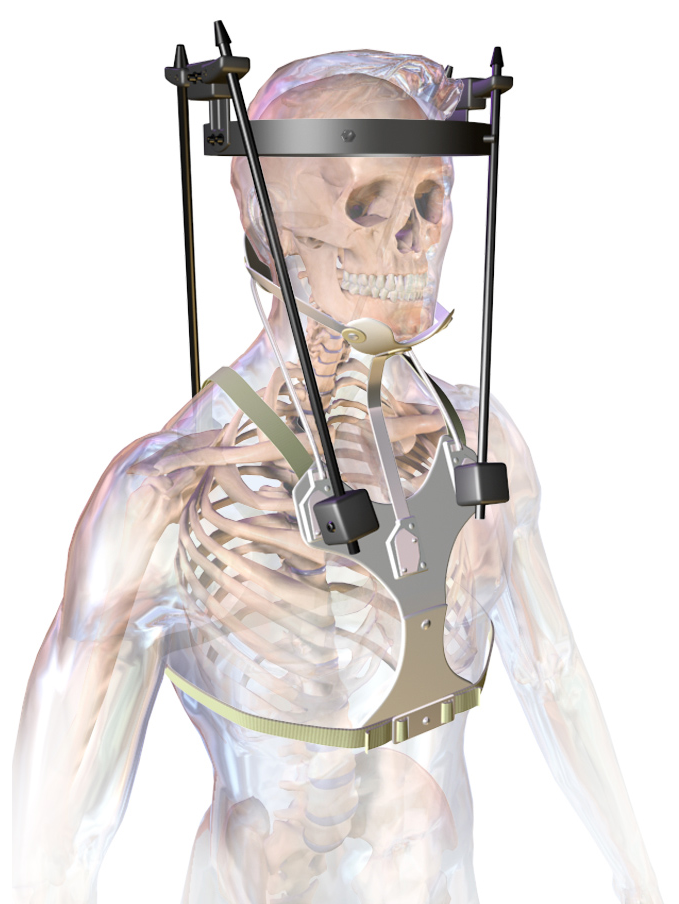
Halo brace used to immobilize the cervical spine

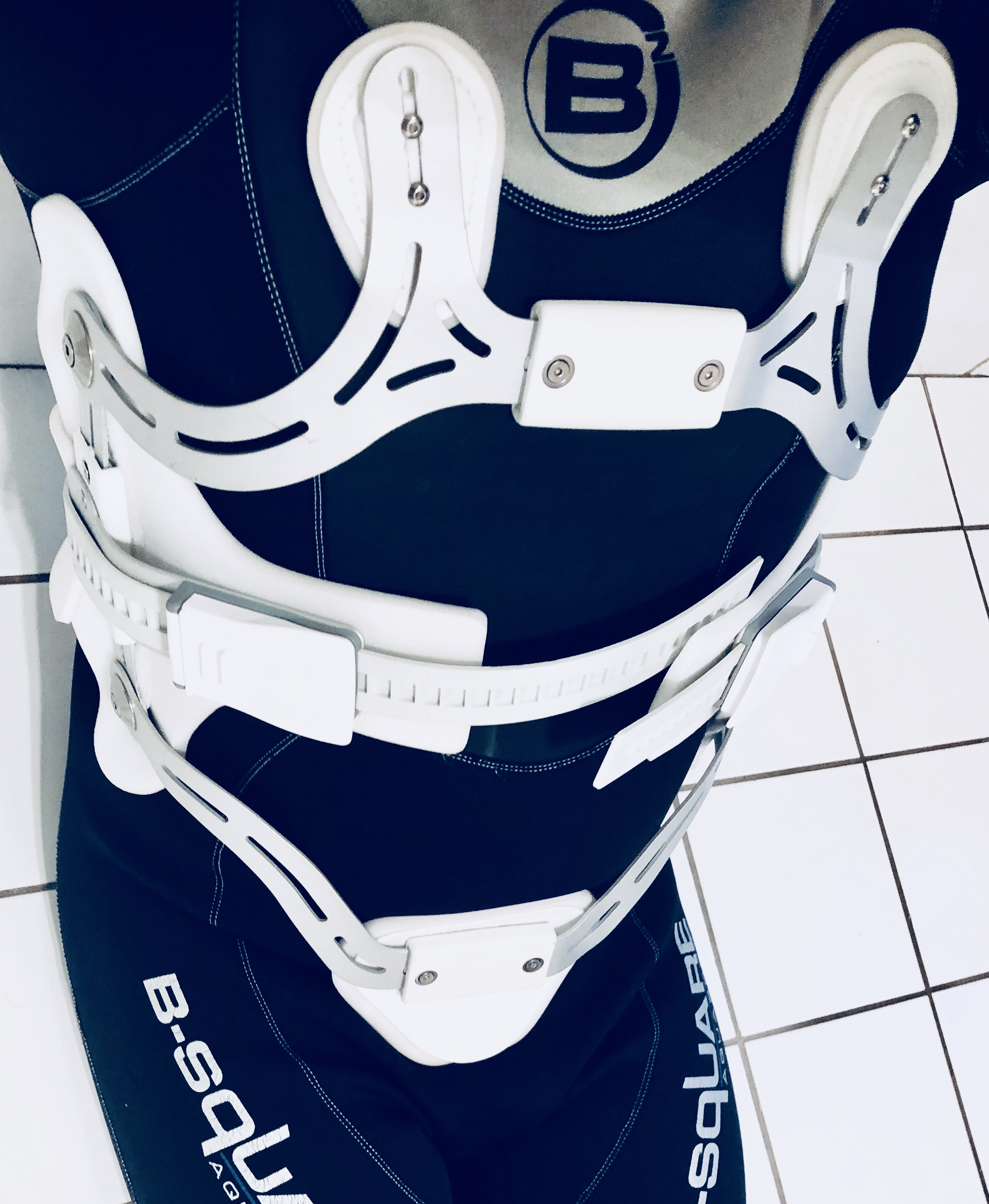
Jewett hyperextension body brace fitted to adolescent female patient in full support body suit. Designated TLSO as the orthosis fits the thoracic, lumbar and sacroiliac regions, making for a thoraco-lumbo-sacral orthosis.

Scoliosis, a condition describing an abnormal curvature of the spine, may in certain cases be treated with spinal orthoses, such as the Milwaukee brace, Boston brace, Charleston bending brace, or Providence brace. As scoliosis most commonly develops in adolescent females who are undergoing their adolescent growth spurt, compliance is hampered by patient concerns about appearance and movement restrictions caused by the brace.

Spinal orthoses may also be used in the treatment of spinal fractures. A Jewett brace, for instance, may be used to aid healing of an anterior wedge fracture involving the T10 to L3 vertebrae, and a body jacket may be used to stabilize more involved fractures of the spine. There are several types of orthoses for managing cervical spine pathology. The halo brace is the most restrictive cervical thoracic orthosis in use; it is used to immobilize the cervical spine, usually following fracture, and was developed by Vernon L. Nickel at Rancho Los Amigos National Rehabilitation Center in 1955.

== Head orthoses ==
Helmets such as a cranial molding orthoses is an example of orthoses for the head. These devices are often suggested for infants with positional plagiocephaly.

== See also ==
- Orthotist
- Cognitive orthotics
- Comparison of orthotics
- Dental braces
- Orthotic horseshoes
- Neuromechanics of orthoses
- Cervical collar
- Orthopedic cast
- Back brace
- Pet orthotics
