= Nachiappan Chockalingam =

British scientist

Nachiappan Chockalingam, professionally known as Nachi Chockalingam is a British scientist, academic practitioner and expert in Clinical Biomechanics. He holds academic positions in the UK, Malta, and India, collaborating with researchers globally. He is a Fellow of the Institute of Physics and Engineering in Medicine and has been appointed to a panel of experts for the Research Excellence Framework. He serves on boards of international scientific societies, edits for multiple journals, and reviews for various publications and grant bodies worldwide. Professor Chockalingam's current focus is translational research, and he has been key in integrating allied health professionals into the biomechanics and medical engineering fields. An advocate for interdisciplinary research and gender equality, he actively supports students and early-career researchers. His involvement extends to charitable organisations, contributing to global efforts on healthy ageing and mobility-assistive technology. Professor Chockalingam has been engaged with the GATE (Global Cooperation on Assistive Technology) initiative for several years and has contributed to the development of World Health Organization (WHO) standards for prosthetic and orthotic service provision and the Assistive Products List. He was elected as a Fellow of the International Society of Biomechanics in 2023. He contributed to development of podiatric biomechanics in the UK and played a pivotal role in the establishment of the journals such as the Footwear Science and is on the editorial panel for a number of scientific and clinical journals.

== Education ==
Chockalingam holds a BEng in Electronics and Instrumentation Engineering from Annamalai University, India. In 1990, he obtained an MSc in Biomedical Engineering Science from Dundee University before proceeding to Staffordshire University where he completed a PhD in Clinical Biomechanics.

== Career and research ==
Chockalingam has international recognition in work across science, technology, engineering and medicine and has contributed extensively to synthesising scientific and clinical evidence. He has experience in the academic, industrial and clinical sectors through his collaboration with external partners in commercial consultancy, international policy and non-governmental organisations. Whilst playing a substantial role in establishing research and academic governance procedures including the establishment of research ethics policy at Staffordshire University, Chockalingam has set up the Centre for Biomechanics and Rehabilitation Technologies. He reached the position of the most senior professor at Staffordshire University and established the current version of the Staffordshire University Professoriate and led it between 2013 and 2020. Between 2016 and 2022, he has contributed to the NIHR Research for Patient Benefit Panel and currently serves in multiple other review panels of global grant awarding bodies including the EPSRC, MRC and the European Commission. He has been involved with learned societies such as the International Society of Biomechanics, International Research Society for Spinal Deformities and the Footwear Biomechanics Group at various levels of leadership.

Chockalingam has made extensive academic contributions to understanding adolescent idiopathic scoliosis. He is a founding member of the Diabetic Foot Research Group and a visiting professor at the University of Malta. Chockalingam has contributed to the development of a culturally competent model of diabetic foot screening at the primary healthcare level and has made important contributions to the identification of priority areas for diabetic foot screening and the provision of rehabilitation and assistive technology. His current work focuses on policy areas related to Allied Health Professionals and telehealth. Recently, he was involved in the launching of a new policy brief to guide the creation of telehealth patient consultation guidelines and training for AHPs. Chockalingam contributes to the developmental work on the provision of assistive technology in the 'Global South' and continues to raise awareness on health inequalities and cultural competency in health screening.

At a national level, for REF2021, Chockalingam has been appointed to the Panel of Experts within Subpanel 24 - Sport and Exercise Sciences, Leisure and Tourism. He is also listed as an expert to the European Parliament in policy areas relating to the assessment of new and emerging technologies, and foresight on long-term scientific and technological trends. He is a trustee for Age UK Staffordshire, Bionic Charity and recently Human Study AV. He was involved in the development of a Field Ventilator in response to the COVID-19 pandemic.

== Awards and recognition ==
As a Freeman of the City of London, he is involved with the activities of the Worshipful Company of Engineers. He was presented with a Lord Mayor's COVID-19 Livery Award for his work on the innovative Field Ventilator project. He was recognised with an Honorary Fellowship of the Royal College of Podiatry in 2023. Honorary fellowship is bestowed upon individuals who have made a substantive and significant contribution to the advancement of the podiatric profession in any of the fields of clinical practice, education, service management or research. He has also been conferred as an Honorary Fellow of the Royal College of Physicians and Surgeons of Glasgow.

== Publications ==
Chockalingam has numerous scholarly outputs which include peer-reviewed papers, published abstracts and book chapters, invited and keynote presentations at international conferences, national and regional meetings. He published a book on Technologies and Techniques in Gait Analysis in 2022
