= Shoe insert =

Removable foot support placed inside footwear

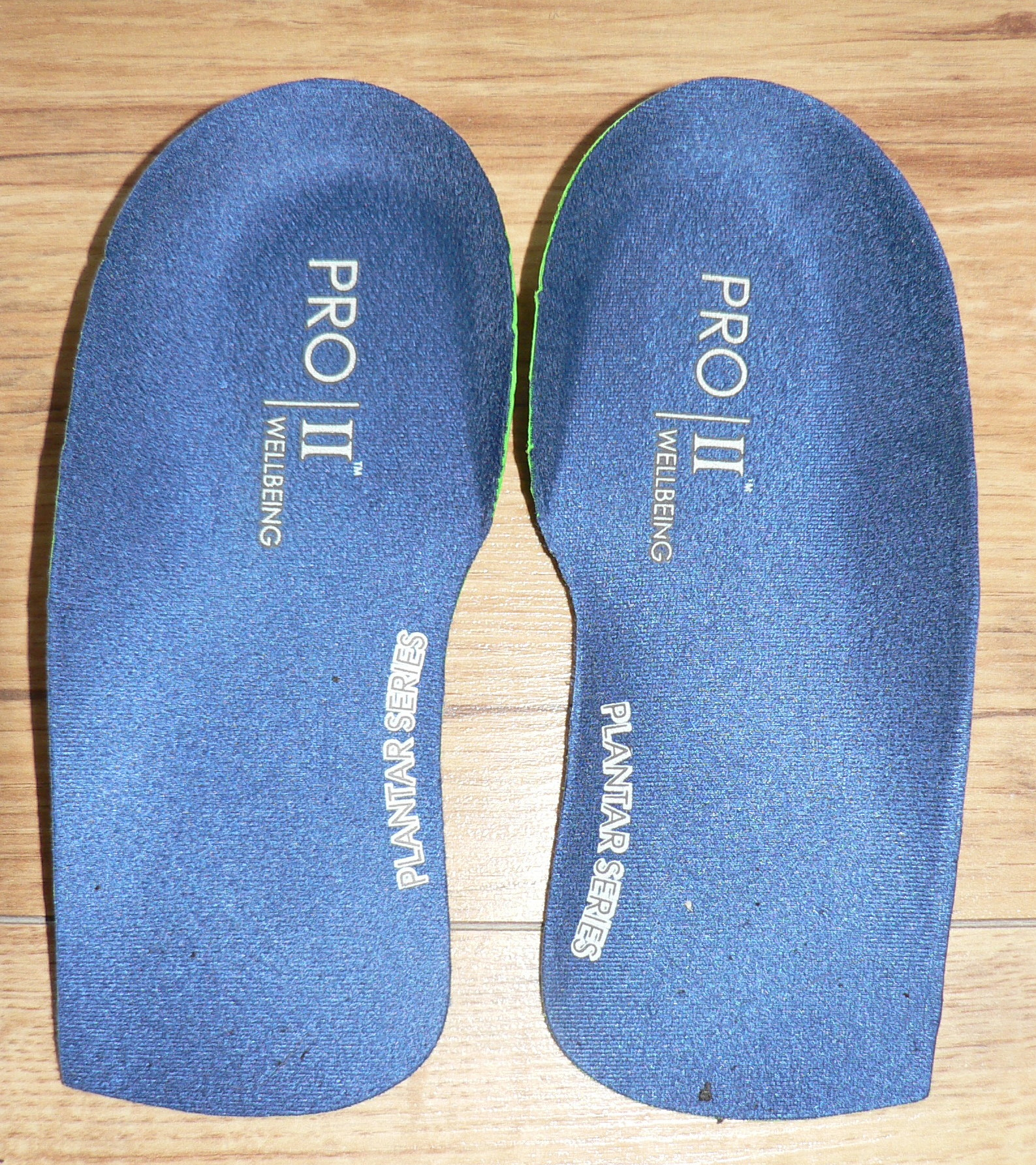
A pair of orthopedic insoles

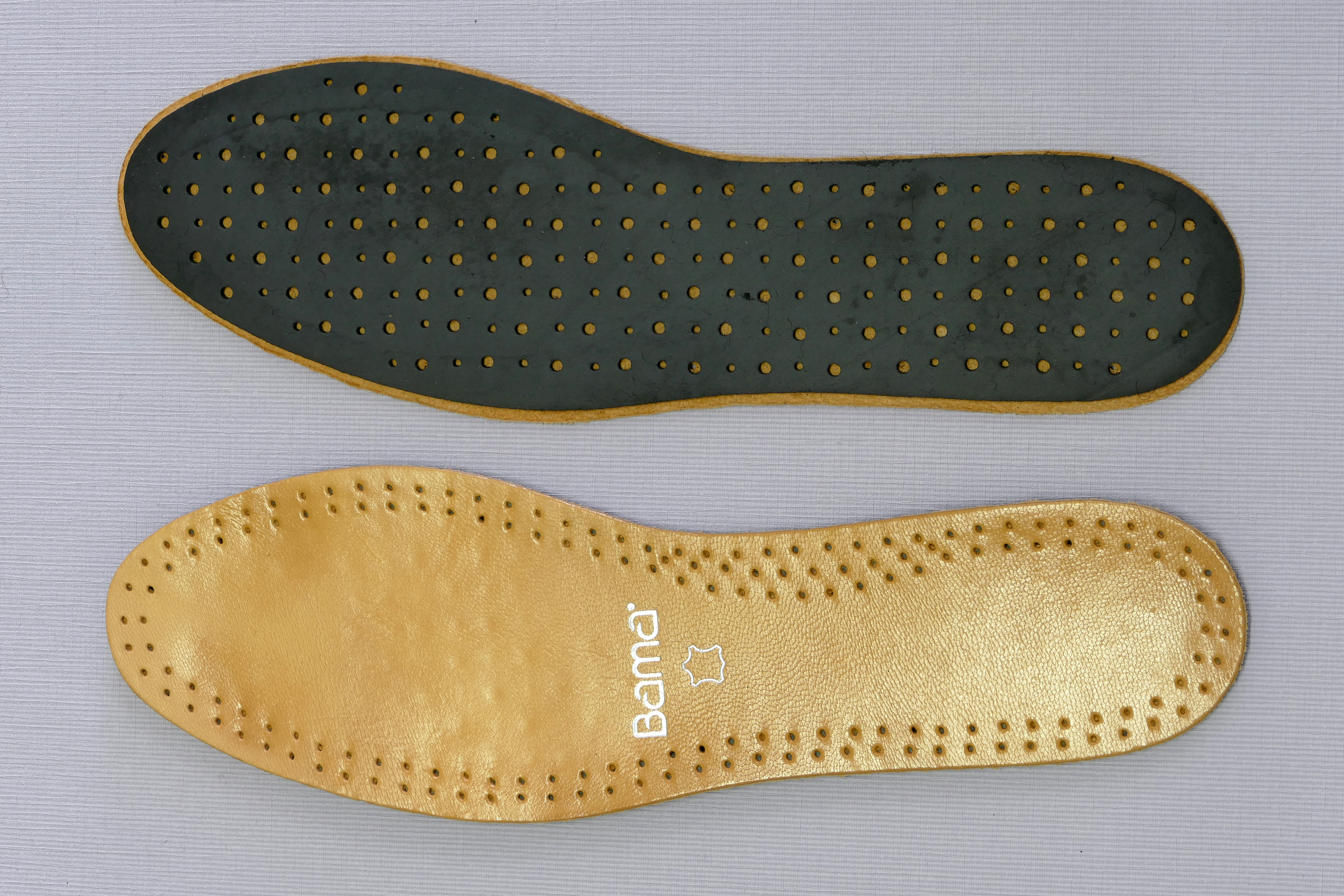
A pair of regular leather inner soles

A removable shoe insert, otherwise known as a foot orthosis, orthotic, insole or inner sole, accomplishes many purposes, including daily wear comfort, height enhancement, plantar fasciitis treatment, arch support, foot and joint pain relief from arthritis, overuse, injuries, leg length discrepancy, and other causes such as orthopedic correction and athletic performance.

Medical use of foot orthoses has been criticized as lacking evidence of benefit, and practice is very inconsistent: reputed podiatrists prescribe completely different orthoses for a single patient. Further, effect of a given design of orthosis varies significantly by patient, and standard practice to personalize prescription is not available. However, evidence is mixed: patients often report at least short-term improvements in comfort, and other studies have found effectiveness.

== Fitting patients ==
There are three standard methods for fitting patients: plaster casts, foam box impressions, or three-dimensional computer imaging. None are very accurate: all produce proper fit under 80% of the time.

Traditionally they were created from plaster casts made from the patient's foot. These casts were made by wrapping dipped plaster or fiberglass strips around the foot to capture the form, then letting it dry and harden. Once the cast was hardened, the doctor would carefully remove it from the patient's foot and ship it, along with a prescription, to an orthotics lab which would use the negative of the cast to create an orthopedic insert.

Recently, several companies have developed digital foot scanners that use specialized software to scan a patient's foot and create a "virtual" cast. These scans are made by having the patient place the foot onto a specialized flat image scanner that uses light and software to capture and create a 3D model. This 3D model is then electronically submitted (along with a prescription) to an orthotics lab, where it is used to program a CNC machine that will ultimately produce the orthopedic insert.

Manufacturers of these products choose various materials.

- Firm supports stay in one exact position.
- Flexible supports maintain the arch positions while moving with the foot through the stride.
- Soft supports might use materials like foam rubber of varying intensity, memory foam, EVA, carbon fiber, silicone gel or filled leather. Because they are soft, their contour is less relevant. Instead, these tend to flatten, serving as shock absorbers. These give the proprioception of support, causing muscles to trigger in response, without true articulated support of the firmer models. Many shoe manufacturers, including athletic shoes, include similar pads with their shoes. Some products might be rubber pads shaped for a specific problem spot. Some of those could include a wrapping apparatus to hold them in place. Currently, there is a paucity of research providing recommendations on the type of orthotic or material used in its construction for different patient requirements.

== Diabetic shoes ==
Diabetic shoes, sometimes referred to as extra depth, therapeutic shoes or Sugar Shoes, are specially designed shoes, intended to reduce the risk of skin breakdown in diabetics with co-existing foot disease.

== See also ==
- Orthotics
- Podiatry
