= Subtalar arthroereisis =

Common treatment for flatfoot

- Specialty: Orthopaedics
- Uses: Treating flexible flat foot
- Complications: Pain in sinus tarsi, implant extrusion, oversized implants, synovitis, infection, and peroneal spasm.
- Recovery time: Plaster fixation might be needed after surgery, non-weight-bearing exercises could be initiated around 3 weeks after surgery, partial weight-bearing function exercises after 6 weeks, resume to sports within 12 months.
- Outcomes: Correcting the excessive subtalar eversion and restore the subtalar joint towards a neutral position.

Subtalar arthroereisis is a common treatment for symptomatic pes planus, also known as flatfoot. There are two forms of pes planus: rigid flatfoot (RFF) and flexible flatfoot (FFF). The symptoms of the former typically necessitate surgical intervention. The latter may manifest fatigue or pain, but is typically asymptomatic.

Subtalar arthroereisis is considered as the last resort for treating FFF in cases when conservative measures fail. This is accomplished by putting an implant into the sinus tarsi to prevent excessive eversion of the subtalar joint and improve talus alignment relative to the calcaneus and navicular. This treatment is considered minimally invasive and joint sparing.

Complications associated with subtalar arthroereisis include undercorrection (due to the use of undersized implants), sinus tarsi pain, and implant extrusion. Less common complications include overcorrection caused by oversized implants, synovitis, infection, and peroneal spasm. Nerve injury can also occur as a complication but can be avoided with careful procedural execution.

Subtalar arthroereisis allows for the removal of the implant in case of postoperative complications while still maintaining the correction achieved for flat feet. The surgery also allows patients to bear weight right after the treatment.

== Medical uses ==
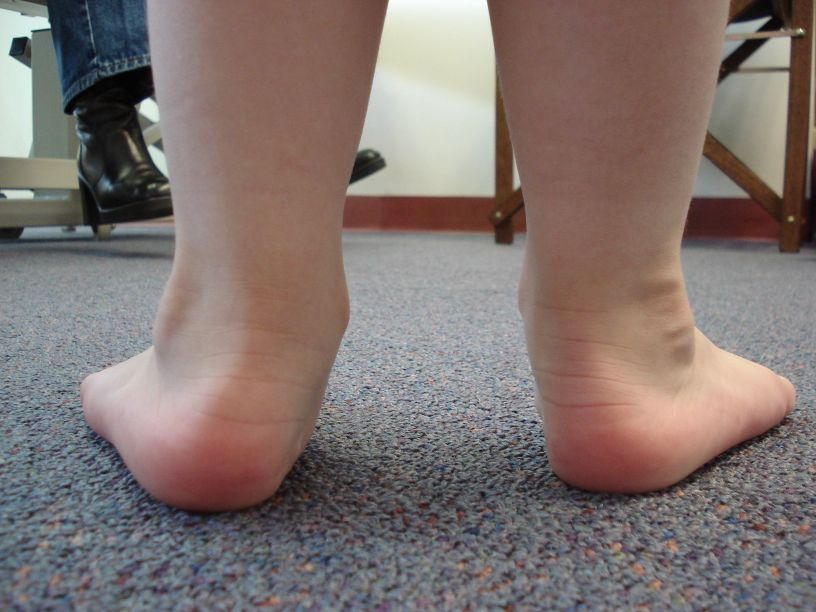
Patient with Pes Planus

=== Pes Planus ===
Subtalar arthroereisis is primarily used for the treatment of flexible pes planus, a condition characterized by the loss of the medial longitudinal arch, abduction of the forefoot, and excessive subtalar eversion. This surgical procedure is specifically designed to address the biomechanical abnormalities associated with flexible flatfoot.

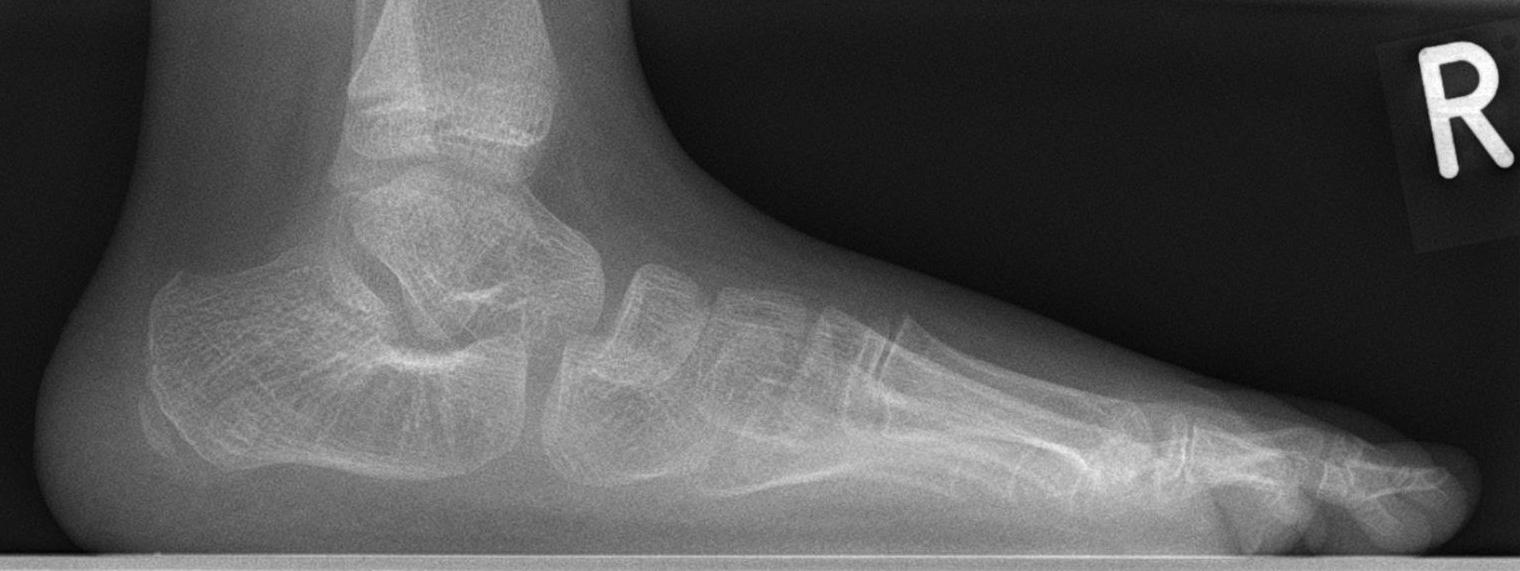
X-ray image of a flat foot

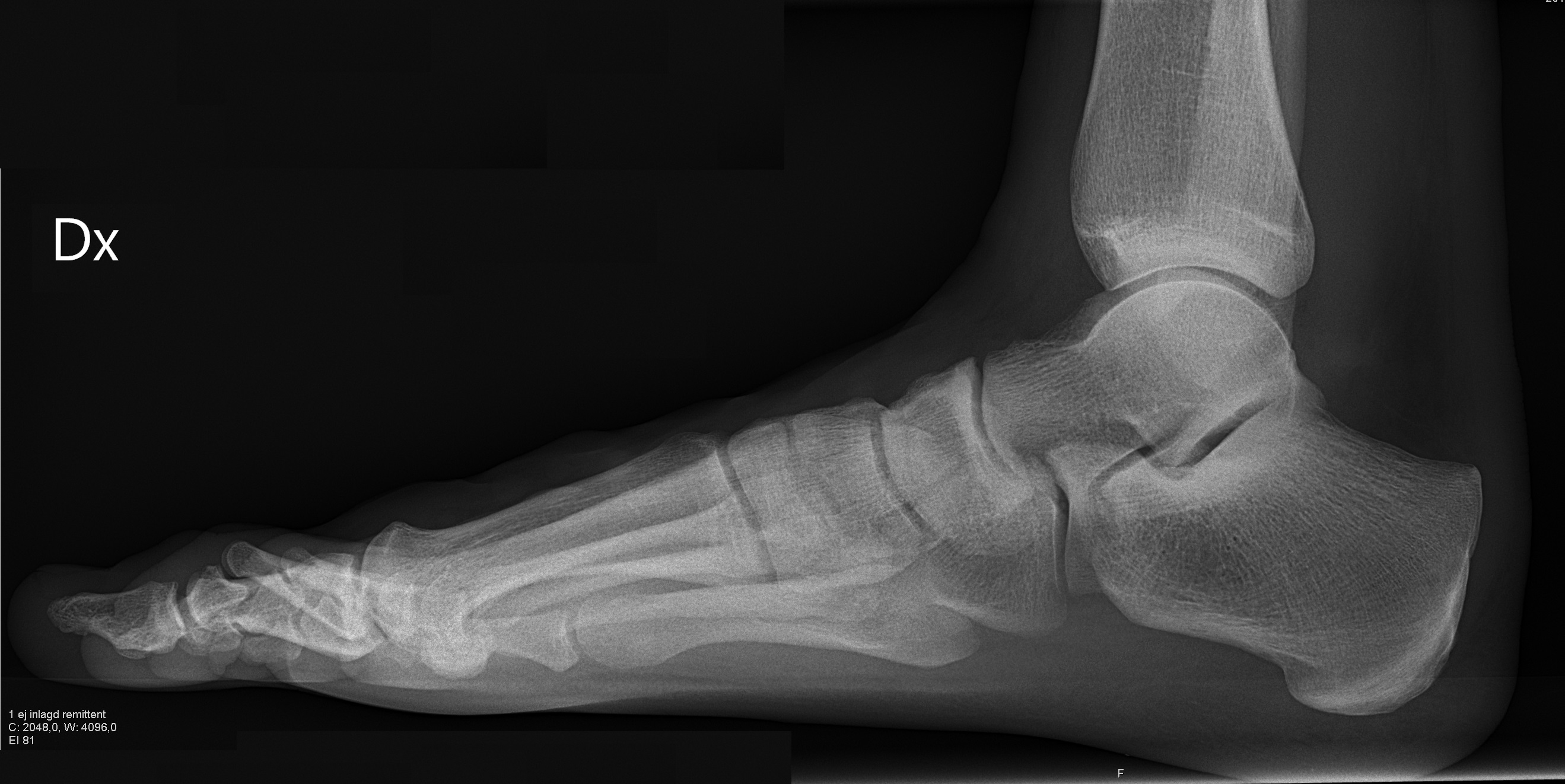
X-ray image of a normal foot

When conservative measures such as physiotherapy, orthotics, and anti-inflammatory medications fail to provide sufficient relief, subtalar arthroereisis becomes a valuable option. It is particularly indicated for patients who experience persistent pain and functional limitations despite non-surgical interventions.

The main purpose of subtalar arthroereisis is to correct the excessive subtalar eversion and restore the subtalar joint to a more neutral position. This is achieved by inserting an implant, typically made of materials such as silicone or polyethylene, into the sinus tarsi or adjacent to it. The implant serves to provide stability and support to the subtalar joint, helping to improve foot alignment and function.

Subtalar arthroereisis can alleviate pain, enhance foot functionality, and improve overall quality of life for individuals with flexible pes planus.

== Clinical Significance ==
The clinical significance of subtalar arthroereisis can be shown by different measurements and physical conditions. Such as radiological measurements, kinematic measurements, and soreness, function, and alignment.

=== Radiological measurements ===
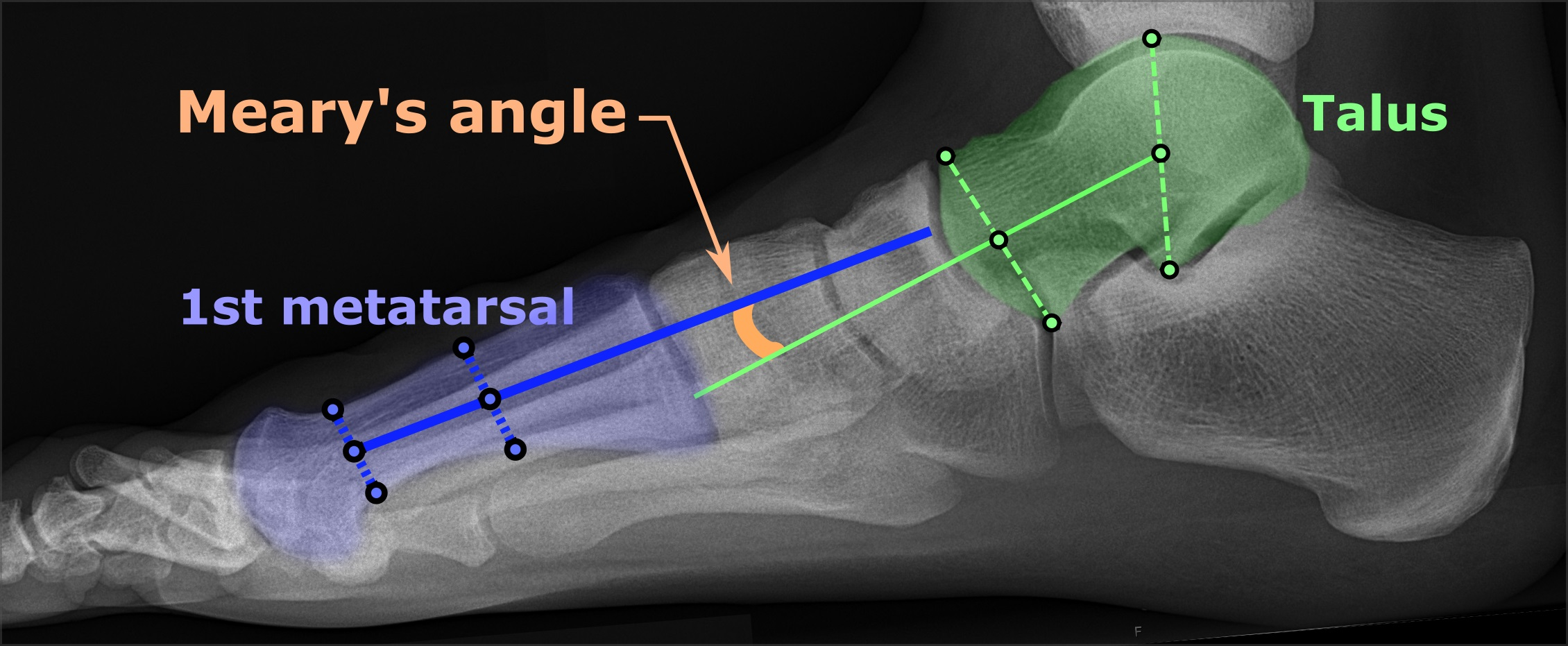
X-ray image showing the location of the measurements.

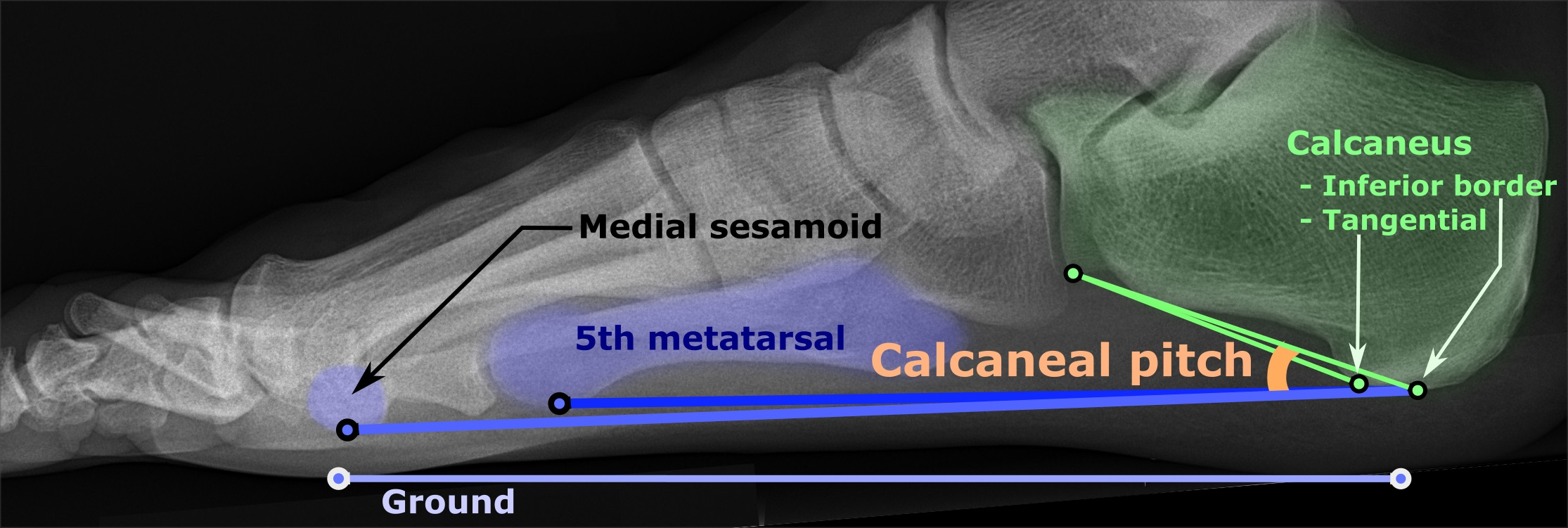
X-ray image showing the location of the calcaneal inclination (calcaneal pitch).

The radiological assessments have exhibited notable enhancements, converging towards the anticipated normal range. Following the surgical procedure, there have been significant improvements observed in several key measurements, including the post-operative anteroposterior (AP) Talar calcaneal angle, which is also known as the kite angle, refers to the angle between lines drawn down the axis of the talus and calcaneus; AP Talar first metatarsal angle which is the angle between the axis of the 1st metatarsal and the axis of the proximal phalanx of the 1st toe; lateral Talar first metatarsal angle, and calcaneal inclination (or calcaneal pitch).

=== Kinematic measurements ===
The kinematic measurements have demonstrated notable improvements, characterized by an average reduction of 8.1° in hindfoot valgus. Furthermore, enhancements have been observed in supination, dorsiflexion, and Viladot grade, approaching values indicative of a normal function.

=== Soreness, function, and alignment ===
Clinical outcomes were evaluated using standardized surveys, including the Manchester-Oxford Foot Questionnaire and the American Orthopedic Foot and Ankle Score, which provide quantitative assessments of various parameters such as pain, function, and alignment. These outcome scores exhibited significant improvements, indicating favorable treatment effects. For instance, pain levels, as measured by the Visual Analogue Scale, decreased from an average of 5.5 before the operation to 1.4 after the operation, reflecting a substantial reduction in pain intensity.

== Contraindications ==
Subtalar arthroereisis is primarily used for the correction of flexible flatfoot, while its utilisation as the primary surgical procedure may not be recommended for cases of rigid pes planus. Contraindications to subtalar arthroereisis encompass various factors, including active infection, previous sinus tarsi surgery or trauma, and advanced arthritis of the subtalar joint.

== Surgical Techniques ==
Arthroereisis surgery can be performed using a variety of methods and strategies and is usually finished in 20 minutes. Anesthesia might be applied locally, regionally, or generally for the surgery. In the case of children, general anesthesia is commonly employed to ensure their stillness during the surgery. A tourniquet is not required because the procedure is carried out percutaneously. During the surgery, the patient lies in a supine position, and the foot undergoing the operation is internally rotated. An incision of approximately 1 cm is made along the relaxed skin's tension lines over the sinus tarsi. Using a hemostat, the tissues are spread until reaching the sinus tarsi. Then, a guide is inserted percutaneously from the lateral to the medial side across the floor of the sinus tarsi. The direction of insertion follows from lateral anterior distal to medial posterior proximal, aligning with the sinus tarsi. To prevent the guidewire from sliding back during trials, the guide pin is pushed towards the medial side and clamped with a hemostat.

The guiding pin passes beneath the medial malleolus and above the posterior tibial tendon. Sizing guides are then installed, followed by trial implants. The objective is to restrict excessive outward turning of the foot, allowing for approximately 5 degrees of eversion from the neutral position. It is important not to insert a large implant that may overcrowd the sinus tarsi. The implant is positioned about 1 to 1.5 cm inside the lateral edge of the calcaneus, towards the medial side, and its position can be confirmed using anteroposterior images. On the lateral side, the implant should be observed resting on the floor of the sinus tarsi. In cases where deformities are present in both feet, bilateral arthroereisis can be performed. Dorsiflexion of the foot is accomplished with the knee extended post surgical repair. Subcutaneous Achilles tendon lengthening is necessary if dorsiflexion is restricted until the foot can be dorsiflexed to 10 degrees.

== Risks and complications ==
Correct alignment of the subtalar joint

Subtalar arthroereisis has advantages over other foot pain treatments for primary and secondary flatfoot, as well as for stabilizing the subtalar joint into its correct alignment. While this procedure offers certain benefits, it is not without its drawbacks. A systematic review of 76 studies has revealed that complication rates range from 4.8% to 18.6%. Of particular concern is the occurrence of unplanned implant removal, which was reported in 7.1% to 19.3% of cases.

Various complications can arise with different types of devices used in subtalar arthroereisis. Common issues include undercorrection resulting from the use of undersized implants, pain in the sinus tarsi, and implant extrusion. Less frequently encountered complications include overcorrection caused by oversized implants, synovitis, infection, and peroneal spasm.

=== Synovitis ===
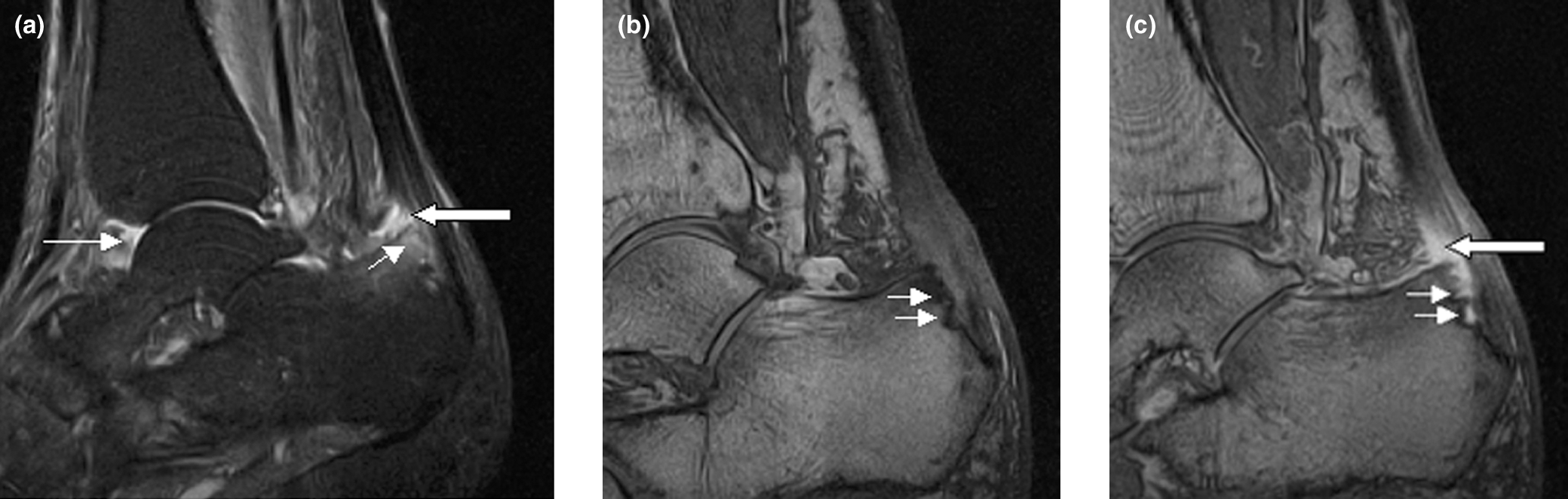
Sagittal magnetic resonance images of ankle region synovitis

Synovitis, a condition characterized by joint inflammation, is often associated with a reaction to silicone microparticles released from silastic implants. Over time, silicone implants can fragment due to the forces exerted on them within the joint. The use of metal implants instead of silastic may potentially reduce implant degradation rates and the corresponding inflammatory response.

=== Nerve injury ===
Nerve injury is another complication that can be prevented through careful procedural execution. Sinus tarsi pain, a common complication, can usually be resolved by removing the implant. However, a rare but serious complication is the occurrence of a talar neck fracture, which can significantly impact mobility and recovery potential.

Treatment options for these complications vary depending on their severity. Possible remedies include replacing an incorrectly sized implant with a larger or smaller one, complete removal of the implant in cases of persistent pain, or the appropriate use of anti-inflammatory or antibiotic treatments.

== Post-operative care ==
Post-operative care is essential for patients who have undergone Achilles tendon lengthening and medial soft tissue tightening, while those without soft tissue surgery or gastrocnemius release may not require plaster fixation. For patients requiring plaster fixation, it is typically maintained for a duration of 4 weeks. During this time, they wear walking braces during the night and engage in passive plantar and dorsal flexion exercises starting from the first day after surgery. On the second day after surgery, active flexion exercises of the ankle are initiated. Suture removal takes place approximately 12–14 days after the operation.

Around 3 weeks after surgery, patients are usually advised to engage in non-weight-bearing exercises such as swimming and bicycling. After 6 weeks, partial weight-bearing functional exercises can be commenced. To monitor the progress of the correction of deformities and the positioning of the implant, AP, lateral, and oblique radiographs are performed immediately after surgery, at 6 weeks, and at 12 weeks. Subsequently, X-rays are taken every 3 months. During the last follow-up, measurements of the Meary angle and the talus-first metatarsal angle are recorded and compared with pre-operative data. The evaluation of functionality is conducted using the AOFAS ankle-hind foot score and the VAS score. Remarkably, all patients are able to resume sports activities within a period of 12 months.

== History ==
The concept of surgically modifying the tarsi and subtalar joint to address flatfoot conditions emerged in 1946 through the proposal made by Chambers. He suggested using a wedge placed on the superior surface of the calcaneus to restrict the anterior displacement of the talus from the calcaneus. The first surgeon to introduce a cortical bone wedge graft into the sinus tarsi was Stefán Haraldsson in 1962. This technique aimed to limit subtalar eversion and treat patients with pes planus. In 1970, LeLièvre from France coined the term "arthroereisis" while describing the insertion of a bone graft into the sinus tarsi, secured with a staple. Subotnick, in 1974, proposed the use of a synthetic silicone implant placed in the sinus tarsi to enhance the proper positioning of the talus with the calcaneus. These developments laid the foundation for the modern-day arthroereisis procedure.
