= HIDEA syndrome =

- HIDEA syndrome is inherited via an autosomal recessive manner.
- Causes: Mutation in P4HTM gene

HIDEA syndrome is a syndrome characterized by hypotonia, hypoventilation, intellectual disability, dysautonomia, epilepsy, and eye abnormalities. It results from mutations in both copies of the P4HTM gene on chromosome 3, which is very highly expressed in the brain and eye. HIDEA syndrome (OMIM #618493) was first characterized in 2019

== Presentation ==
This syndrome affects many body systems, impairing cognition, vision, breathing, and more.

=== Eyes ===
- Strabismus
- Difficulty fixing the eyes on an object

=== Face ===
Facial features gradually become coarser during childhood.

=== Musculoskeletal system ===
- Hypotonia
- Planovalgus
- Contractures in elbow joints
- Interphalangeal joint hypermobility

=== Respiratory system ===
- Hypoventilation
- Obstructive and central sleep apnea

Affected individuals are vulnerable to respiratory distress during infection, such as pneumonia. Respiratory evaluation, including a sleep study, as well as oxygen monitoring at night (pulse oximetry) is valuable as preventative measurements. Anesthesia is a risk for these patients because of their hypoventilation.

=== Nervous system ===
P4HTM is very highly expressed throughout the brain. despite these patients having severe intellectual disability, brain MRI is normal in most patients.

=== Other features ===
- Dysautonomia, often including hypothermia or hyperthermia, and constipation.

== Genetics ==
This condition is caused by mutations in the Prolyl 4-hydroxylase, transmembrane (P4HTM) gene. This gene is located on the short arm of chromosome 3 (3p21.3). Within a cell, Prolyl 4-hydroxylases (P4Hs) play an important role in making collagens and also helping the cell react in the state of hypoxia (lack of oxygen).

The inheritance of this condition is autosomal recessive.

== Diagnosis ==
The diagnosis may be suspected on clinical grounds.

It is made by sequencing the P4HTM gene.

== Management ==
There is presently no curative treatment for HIDEA syndrome, but the management of respiratory depression with noninvasive or invasive ventilation, even intermittent, is very helpful in many patients.

== Epidemiology ==
The prevalence is not known, but this is considered to be a rare disease. Only 24 patients have been reported to date across the globe, but given its recent discovery, it is expected that there are many more patients left undiagnosed today.

== History ==
This condition was first described in 2014. The causative mutation was discovered in 2019.
