= Pes cavus =

- Other names: High instep, high arch, talipes cavus, cavoid foot, supinated foot
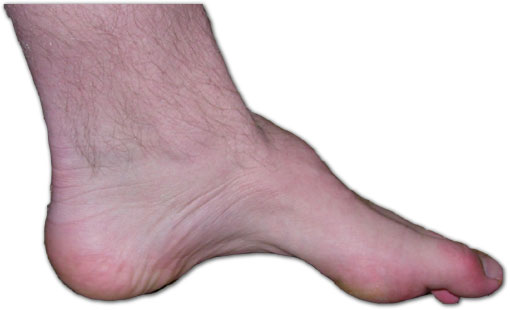
- High arch in foot of a person with a hereditary neuropathy
- Specialty: Medical genetics, Podiatry

Pes cavus, also known as high arch, is an orthopedic condition that presents as a hollow arch underneath the foot with a pronounced high ridge at the top when weight bearing.

This foot type is typically characterized with cavus—the elevation of the longitudinal plantar arch (e.g., the bottom arch of a foot), plantar flexion of the foot, forefoot pronation, hindfoot varus, or forefoot adduction. A high arch is the opposite of a flat foot and is somewhat less common.

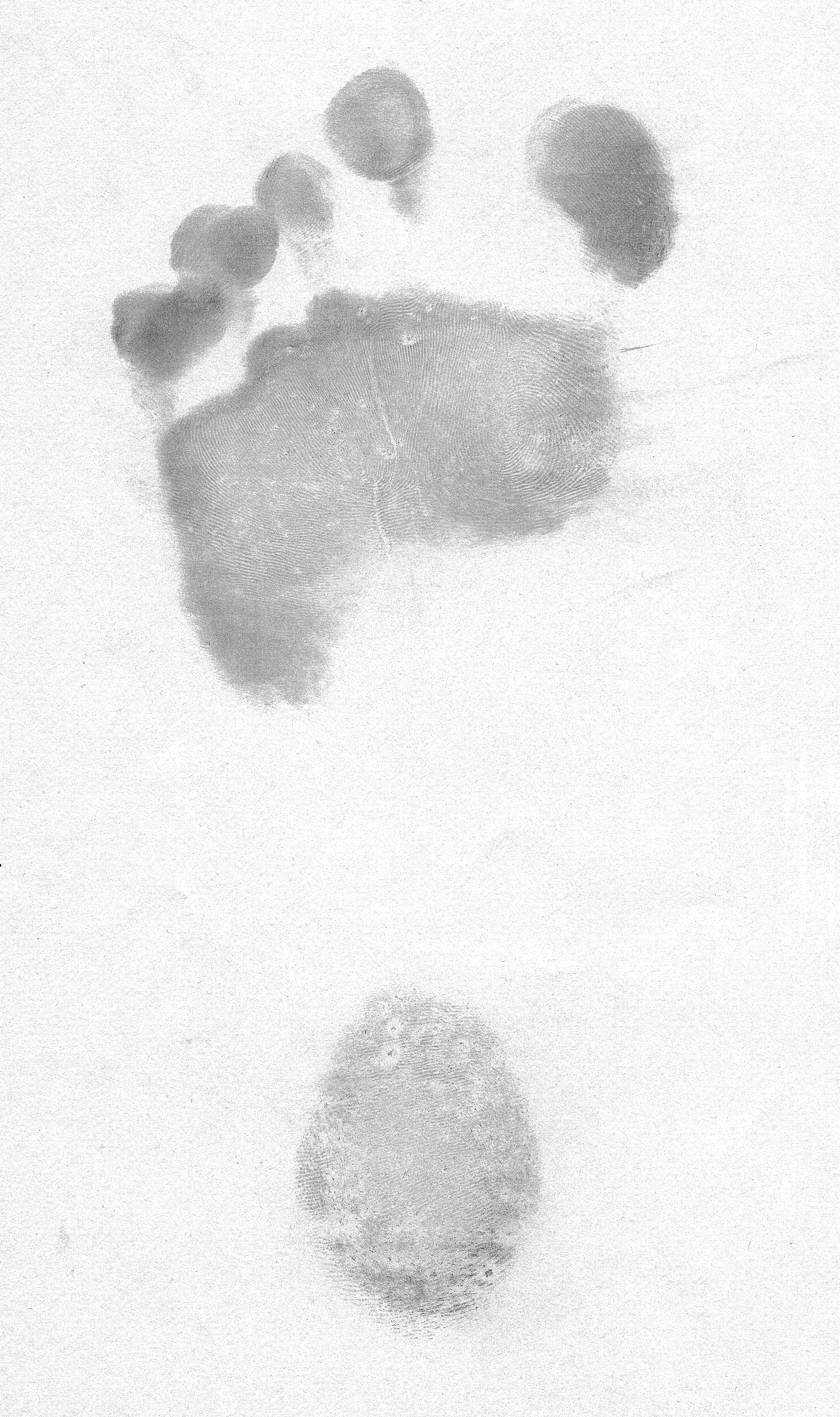
Footprint of a person with pes cavus, recognizable by the missing midfoot area due to the high arch of the foot

== Signs and symptoms ==
=== Pain and disability ===
As with certain cases of flat feet, high arches may be painful due to metatarsal compression; however, high arches—particularly if they are flexible or properly cared-for—may be an asymptomatic condition.

People with pes cavus sometimes—though not always—have difficulty finding shoes that fit and may require support in their shoes. Children with high arches who have difficulty walking may wear specially designed insoles, which are available in various sizes and can be made to order.

Individuals with pes cavus frequently report foot pain, which can lead to a significant limitation in function. The range of complaints reported in the literature include metatarsalgia, pain under the first metatarsal, plantar fasciitis, painful callosities, ankle arthritis, and Achilles tendonitis.

There are many other symptoms believed to be related to the cavus foot. These include shoe-fitting problems, lateral ankle instability, lower limb stress fractures, knee pain, iliotibial band syndrome, back pain and tripping.

Foot pain in people with pes cavus may result from abnormal plantar pressure loading because, structurally, the cavoid foot is regarded as being rigid and non-shock absorbent and having reduced ground contact area. There have previously been reports of an association between excessive plantar pressure and foot pathology in people with pes cavus.

== Cause ==
Pes cavus can occur from four primary causes: neurological conditions, trauma, undertreated clubfoot, or idiopathic with other underlining conditions.

Bilateral presentation (i.e., in both feet) often occurs due to a hereditary or congenital source, whereas a unilateral presentation (i.e., in one foot) is often the result of trauma.

Pes cavus is primarily caused by an underlying neurological process or is idiopathic (unknown) in its cause. Among adults with symptomatic pes cavus, two-thirds have a neurological condition most commonly within the hereditary motor and sensory neuropathies (HMSNs). These can include the Hereditary Motor and Sensory Neuropathy Type 1 (Charcot-Marie-Tooth disease) and Friedreich's Ataxia.

The cause and deforming mechanism underlying pes cavus is complex and not well understood. Factors considered influential in the development of pes cavus include muscle weakness and imbalance in neuromuscular disease, residual effects of congenital clubfoot, post-traumatic bone malformation, contracture of the plantar fascia, and shortening of the Achilles tendon.

Among the cases of neuromuscular pes cavus, 50% have been attributed to Charcot–Marie–Tooth disease (CMT), which is the most common type of inherited neuropathy with an incidence of 1 per 2,500 persons affected. Also known as hereditary motor and sensory neuropathy (HMSN), it is genetically heterogeneous and occasionally idiopathic. There are many different types and subtypes of CMT, and as a result, it can present from infancy through to adulthood. CMT is a peripheral neuropathy, affecting the distal muscles first as weakness, clumsiness, and frequent falls. It usually affects the feet first, but can sometimes begin in the hands. CMT can cause painful foot deformities such as pes cavus. Although it is a relatively common disease, many doctors and laypersons are not familiar with it. There are no cures or effective courses of treatment to halt the progression of any form of CMT at this time.

The development of the cavus foot structure seen in CMT has been previously linked to an imbalance of muscle strength around the foot and ankle. A hypothetical model proposed by various authors describes a relationship whereby weak evertor muscles are overpowered by stronger invertor muscles, causing an adducted forefoot and inverted rearfoot. Similarly, weak dorsiflexors are overpowered by stronger plantarflexors, causing a plantarflexed first metatarsal and anterior pes cavus.

Pes cavus is also evident in people without neuropathy or other neurological deficit. In the absence of neurological, congenital, or traumatic causes of pes cavus, the remaining cases are classified as idiopathic because their aetiology is unknown.

== Diagnosis ==
On weightbearing projectional radiography, pes cavus can be diagnosed and graded by several features, the most important being medial peritalar subluxation, increased calcaneal pitch (variable) and abnormal talar-1st metatarsal angle (Meary's angle). Medial peritalar subluxation can be demonstrated by a medially rotated talonavicular coverage angle.

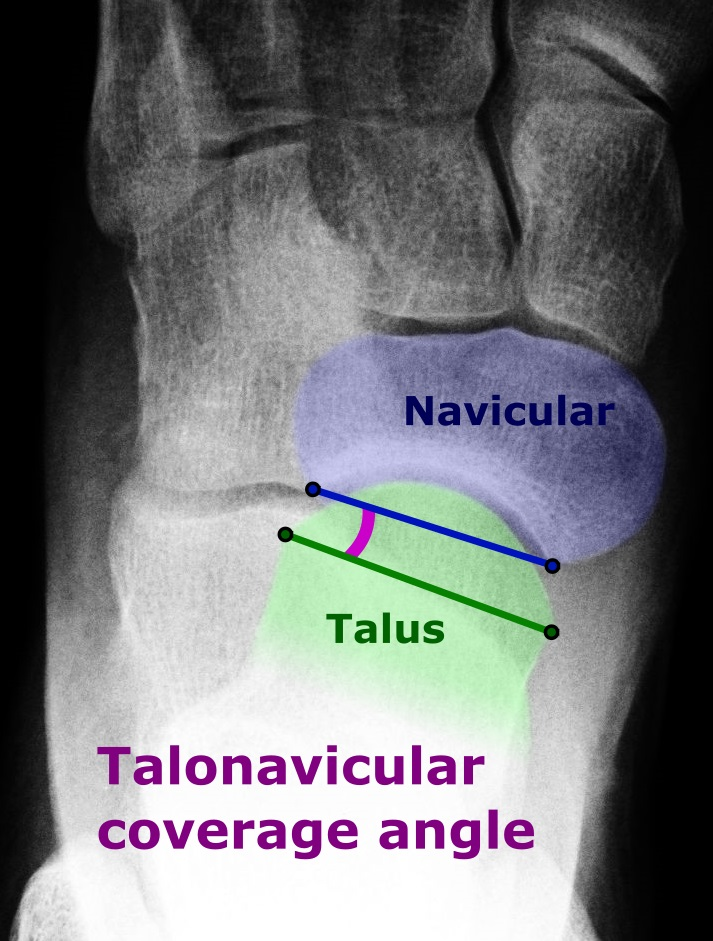
Dorsoplantar projectional radiograph of the foot showing the measurement of the talonavicular coverage angle

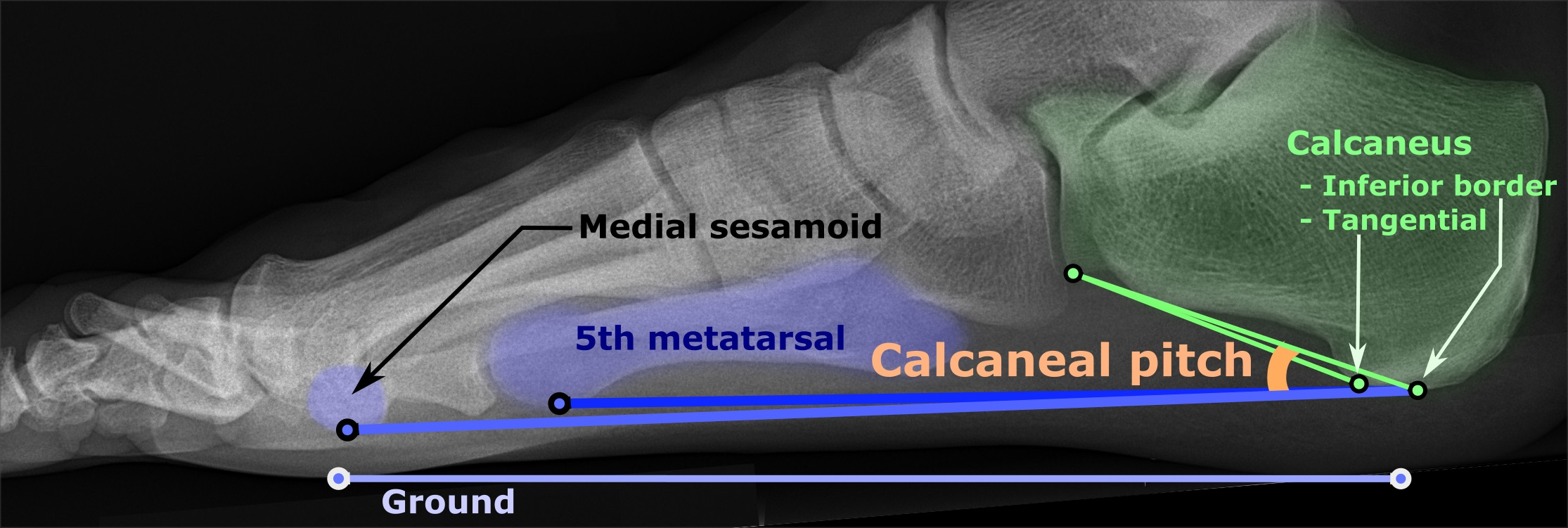
Weight-bearing lateral X-ray showing the measurement of calcaneal pitch, which is an angle of the calcaneus and the inferior aspect of the foot, with different sources giving different reference points. Calcaneal pitch is increased in pes cavus, with cutoffs ranging from 20° to 32°.

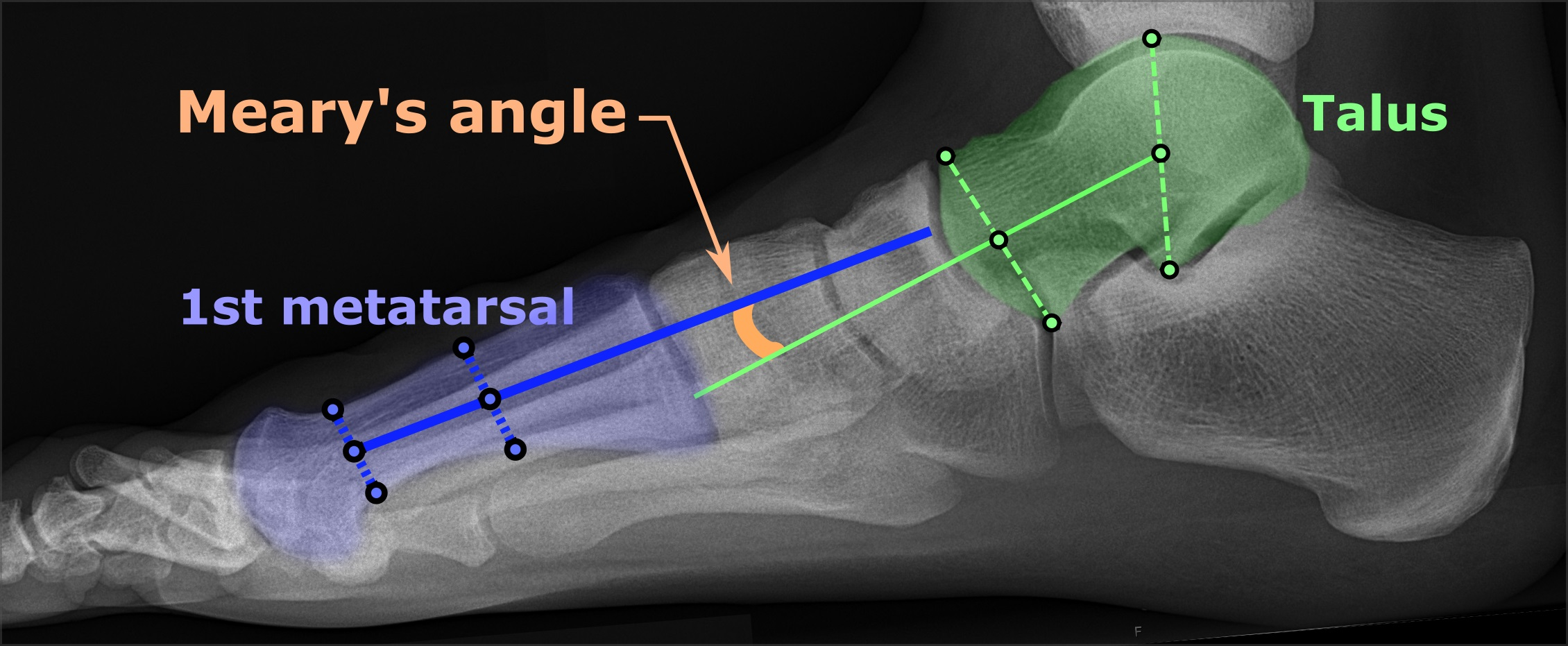
Same lateral X-ray showing the measurement of Meary's angle, which is the angle between the long axis of the talus and first metatarsal bone. This example is slightly convex downward. An angle greater than 4° convex upward is considered pes cavus.

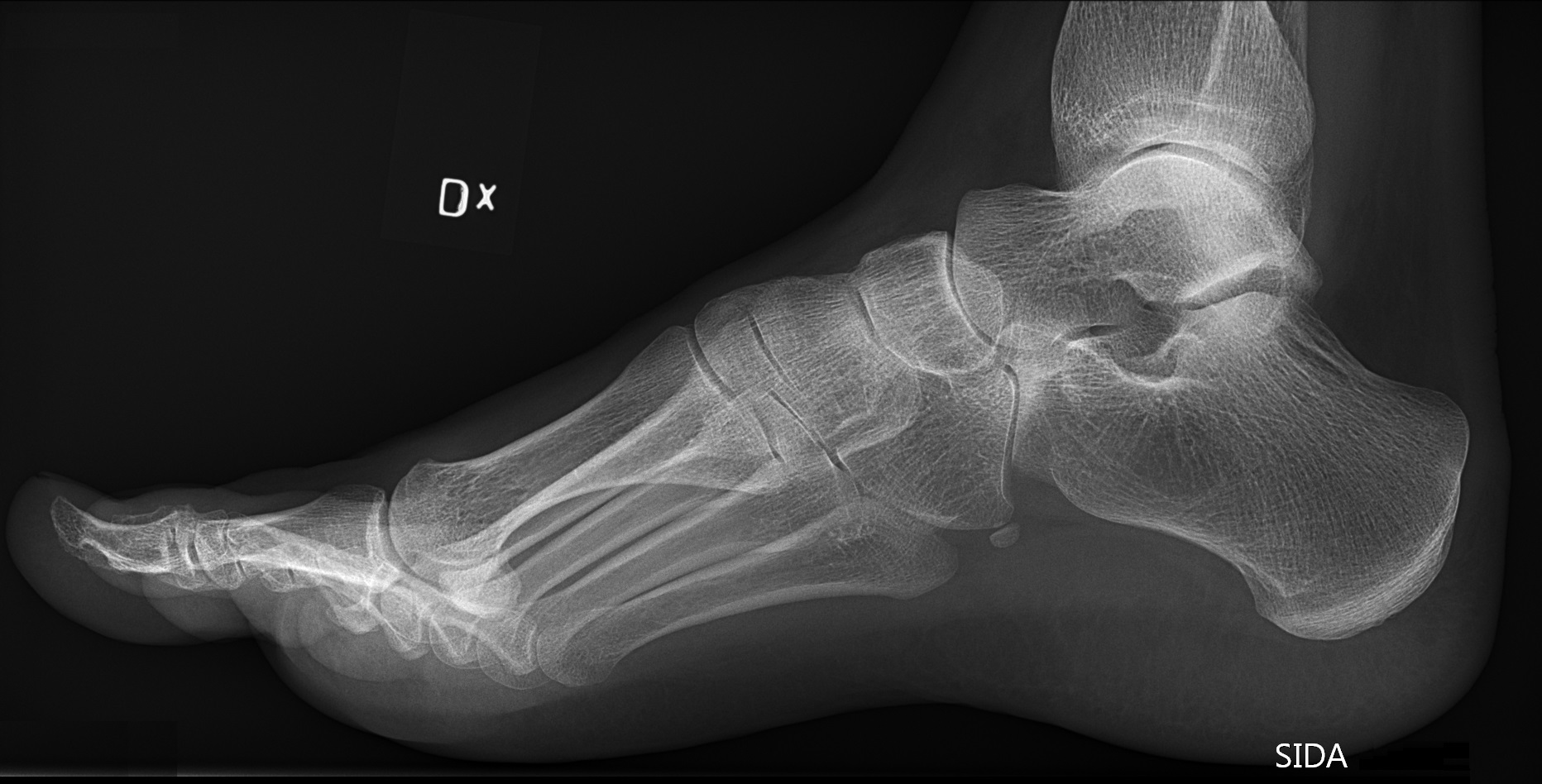
Foot with pes cavus (and os peroneum)

=== Types ===
The term pes cavus encompasses a broad spectrum of foot deformities. Three main types of pes cavus are regularly described in the literature: pes cavovarus, pes calcaneocavus, and 'pure' pes cavus. The three types of pes cavus can be distinguished by their aetiology, clinical signs and radiological appearance.

==== Pes cavovarus ====
Pes cavovarus, the most common type of pes cavus, is seen primarily in neuromuscular disorders such as Charcot–Marie–Tooth disease and, in cases of unknown aetiology, is conventionally termed 'idiopathic'. Pes cavovarus presents with the calcaneus in varus, the first metatarsal plantarflexed, and a claw-toe deformity. Radiological analysis of pes cavus in Charcot–Marie–Tooth disease shows the forefoot is typically plantarflexed in relation to the rearfoot.

==== Pes calcaneocavus ====
In the pes calcaneocavus foot, which is seen primarily following paralysis of the triceps surae due to poliomyelitis, the calcaneus is dorsiflexed and the forefoot is plantarflexed. Radiological analysis of pes calcaneocavus reveals a large talo-calcaneal angle.

==== Subtle pes cavus ====
In 'pure' pes cavus, the calcaneus is neither dorsiflexed nor in varus and is highly arched due to a plantarflexed position of the forefoot on the rearfoot.

A combination of any or all of these elements can also be seen in a 'combined' type of pes cavus that may be further categorized as flexible or rigid.

Despite various presentations and descriptions of pes cavus, not all incarnations are characterised by an abnormally high medial longitudinal arch, gait disturbances, and resultant foot pathology.

== Management ==
=== Non-operative ===
Suggested conservative management of patients with painful pes cavus typically involves strategies to reduce and redistribute plantar pressure loading with the use of foot orthoses and specialised cushioned footwear. Other non-surgical rehabilitation approaches include stretching and strengthening of tight and weak muscles, debridement of plantar callosities, osseous mobilization, massage, chiropractic manipulation of the foot and ankle, and strategies to improve balance.

=== Operative ===
Surgical treatment is only initiated if there is severe pain, as the available operations can be difficult.

There are also numerous surgical approaches described in the literature that are aimed at correcting the deformity and rebalancing the foot. Surgical procedures fall into three main groups:

1. soft-tissue procedures (e.g. plantar fascia release, Achilles tendon lengthening, tendon transfer);
2. osteotomy (e.g. metatarsal, midfoot or calcaneal);
3. bone-stabilising procedures (e.g. triple arthrodesis).

== Epidemiology ==
There are few good estimates of prevalence for pes cavus in the general community. While pes cavus has been reported in between 2 and 29% of the adult population, there are several limitations of the prevalence data reported in these studies. Population-based studies suggest the prevalence of the cavus foot is approximately 10%.

== History ==
The term pes cavus is Latin for 'hollow foot' and is synonymous with the terms talipes cavus, cavoid foot, high-arched foot, and supinated foot type.

Pes cavus is a multiplanar foot deformity characterised by an abnormally high medial longitudinal arch. Pes cavus commonly features a varus (inverted) hindfoot, a plantarflexed position of the first metatarsal, an adducted forefoot, and dorsal contracture of the toes. Despite numerous anecdotal reports and hypothetical descriptions, very little rigorous scientific data exist on the assessment or treatment of pes cavus.

== See also ==
- Arches of the foot
- Foot type
- En pointe
- Foot binding
- Rocker bottom foot
