= Propodeum =

Body part of certain invertebrates

Propodeum labelled within the alitrunk of an ant worker

The propodeum (Note: zooanatomical jargon derived from Ancient Greek: πρωπόδιον "forefoot", also as 'propodeon' or 'propodium'; plurals 'propodea', 'propodia', or by appending -s to the singular) is a term that can refer to unrelated structures in insects or in mollusks.

== Insects ==
The first abdominal segment in Apocrita Hymenoptera (wasps, bees and ants) is known as the propodeum. It is fused with the thorax to form the mesosoma. It is a single large sclerite, not subdivided, and bears a pair of spiracles. It is strongly constricted posteriorly to form the articulation of the petiole, and gives apocritans their distinctive shape. There may be a suture between the propodeum and the thorax, like in Symphyta or not, and the presence or absence of such suture can aid in identifying specimens.

== Mollusks ==
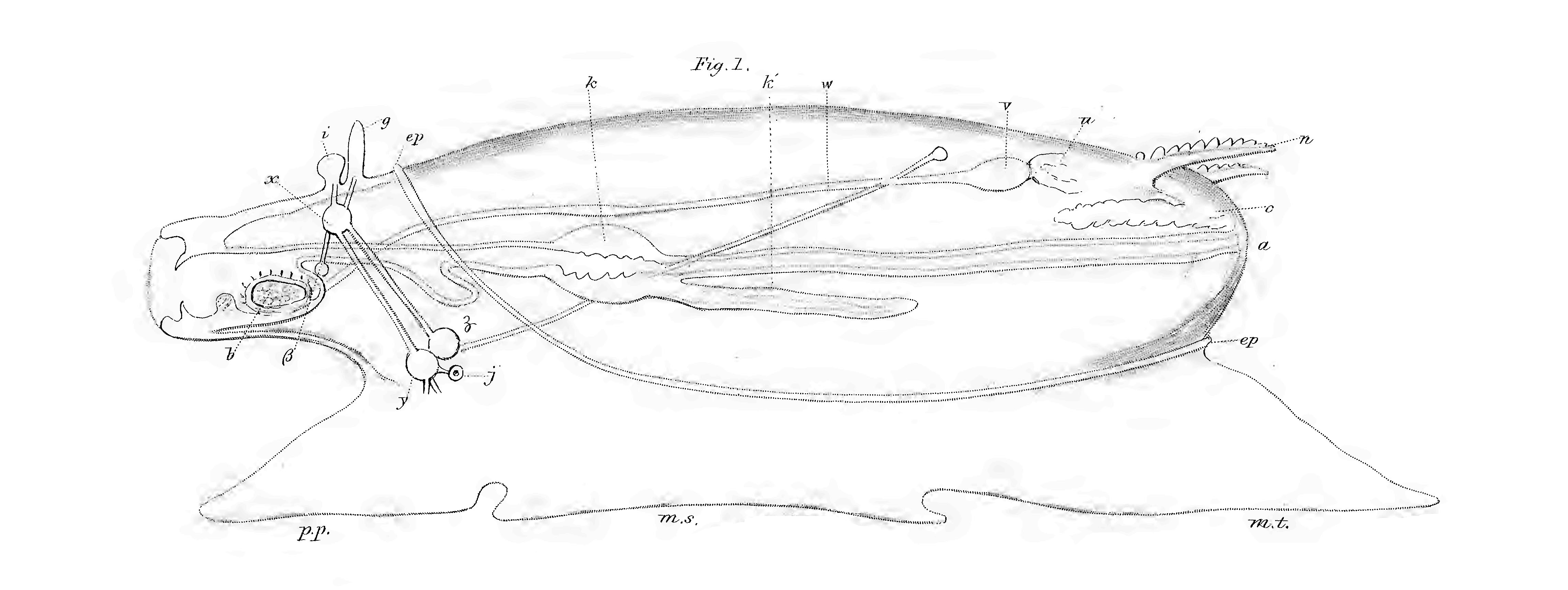
Thomas Henry Huxley's diagram of a hypothetical stem mollusk labels the propodeum shown at lower left as 'p.p.'

Propodeum is the anterior (frontal) part of the foot of a mollusk.
