= Foot arch stretcher =

Device used to stretch the arches of the foot

A foot arch stretcher (also known as a foot stretcher, arch stretcher, pointe stretcher, toe stretcher, or arch enhancer) is a device used in the fields of ballet, dance, gymnastics, cheerleading, and other athletics in order to stretch the arches of the foot. It is believed that regular use of a foot arch stretcher may increase flexibility in the arch, ankle, and metatarsal areas of the foot. A process necessary to avoid foot and ankle injury while participating in athletic activities.

== Components ==
A foot arch stretcher generally consists of two components: a base and a foot sleeve.

The base is generally one to two feet long and is made of a rigid material. In general, either the full base or parts of the base are covered with foam or another soft material and overlaid with fabric. This manufacturing process is used to both hold the shape of the foot arch stretcher and to provide comfort for the areas of the leg and foot that will come into contact with the base while in use. Sometimes, additional padding is added to the area of the foot stretcher base that will come into contact with the heel of the foot. This additional padding is added for comfort because the heel area usually receives the most leverage and accompanying pressure during the stretching process.

The foot sleeve is attached to the front portion of the base and is usually made of sturdy fabric or elastic. The purpose of the foot sleeve is to hold the foot in place during the stretching process.

While this combination of a base and foot sleeve is the standard composition of most foot arch stretchers, some foot arch stretcher models have different components and function in a completely different manner.

== Functionality ==
Foot arch stretchers normally function through proper application of the law of physics by applying leverage as a mechanical advantage.

Foot arch stretchers are generally used from a sitting position with the legs extended to the front. On most foot arch stretcher models, the user begins with a bent knee and places the front portion of the foot (including the toes) into the foot arch stretcher sleeve. Once the foot is secured in place, the user slides the foot arch stretcher forward along the floor while slowly straightening the leg. As the leg slides forward, leverage from the stretcher base increases while the foot sleeve keeps the toes in place. This, in effect, applies pressure and induces stretching of the muscles and tendons in the arch, ankle, and metatarsal areas. The straighter the leg becomes, the more intense the stretch will be.

== Users ==
Foot arch stretchers are mainly used by ballet dancers (ballerinas) in order to aid the process of going "en pointe" or dancing on the tips of their toes. However, foot arch stretchers are also commonly used by all types of dancers (jazz dance, tap dance, modern dance, hip-hop dance, etc.) as well as gymnasts, cheerleaders, yoga practitioners, runners, swimmers, rowers, martial artists, ice skaters and other athletes looking for flexibility in the foot.

== History ==
The first commercial production of foot arch stretchers was around the turn of the 21st century. However, there are accounts of foot arch stretcher designs dating before that time.

Prior to the invention of foot arch stretchers, dancers found creative ways to stretch their feet: usually placing their feet under pianos or couches, or having a partner manually force the stretch. It wasn't until the early 2000s that a few crafty dancers put their minds to work and came up with a solution. Between 2000 and 2001 foot arch stretchers first emerged in both the United States of America (with the Arch Genie) and in Europe (with the Ballet Footstretch). Since the creation and introduction of these foot arch stretchers to the market, there have been many imitation foot stretchers flooding the market.

== Controversy ==
The safety and efficacy of using foot arch stretchers has been called into question by many dance and healthcare specialists. Most of the controversy surrounds the idea that foot stretchers weaken the muscles and tendons by forcing them into "pointe" position for long periods of time. However, most of the same sources agree that foot arch stretchers can be a valuable addition to dance training when accompanied by strengthening exercises to build up the areas of the foot that are stretched.
