= Foot type =

Differences in foot structure and shape

Foot type refers to differences in foot structure and shape, as reflected in pronation (side-to-side tilting of the foot) during heel strike running.

Foot type affects the reduction of impact on the foot while walking, jogging, or running. Specifically, the shape of the individual’s foot as a whole, the shape of their arch, and the extent to which they pronate, determines foot type.

== Common misconceptions about foot type ==
=== Flat feet ===
It is a common misconception that those with fallen arches or flat feet overpronate. However, individuals with flat feet can have a neutral, overpronated, or underpronated gait. Likewise, individuals with very high arches can be neutral, overpronated, or underpronated. Pronation depends not on the shape of the foot or on the shape of the static arch, but on the extent to which the arch collapses when the foot goes through its walk cycle.

=== The wet foot test ===
Some will suggest doing the wet foot test to determine foot type. The wet foot test involves wetting the bottom of the feet and standing on a paper bag to make a footprint. Footprints with a very narrow, curved shape are said to represent high arches and thus underpronated foot types; footprints with a semi-curved shape are said to represent medium arches and thus neutral foot types, and footprints with a very straight shape are said to represent flat feet and thus overpronated foot types.

While it is certainly possible that an individual with a high arch may underpronate, one with a medium arch may be neutral, and so on, this is not always the case. The wet foot test is often inaccurate because it only shows the shape of the foot when the foot is static. The wet foot test fails to determine what happens to the foot while it is in motion - that is, as the foot strikes from heel to toe.

The wet foot test also fails to account for the bone structure of the entire leg; i.e., internal rotation, external rotation, or Genu varum.

== Foot type and injuries ==
A common injury associated with overpronation is plantar fasciitis, which results from the ripping and subsequent inflammation of the plantar fascia underneath the foot as the arch collapses. Orthotics, which are rigid inserts designed to prevent the arch from collapsing, are often prescribed by Podiatrists, orthotists and physiotherapists for various injuries including plantar fasciitis. Over-the-counter inserts function in a similar manner.

A common injury associated with both overpronation and underpronation/supination is iliotibial band syndrome. Pain is generally felt in the hip or the lateral side of the knee.

== Foot type and shoes ==
Stiff shoes tend to support overpronated feet because they prevent the foot from rolling inwards as it progresses from heel to toe. The last of the shoe is generally determinant of the shoe's stiffness: straighter lasts tend to render the shoe stiffer. More curved lasts tend to make the shoe more flexible, and thus more appropriate for neutral pronators or underpronators.

Some running shoes have pieces of denser material built into their medial side. This also helps guide the overpronated foot back into a neutral position.
