= Sinus tarsi syndrome =

Disorder of pain and tenderness in the sinus tarsi

- Other names: STS
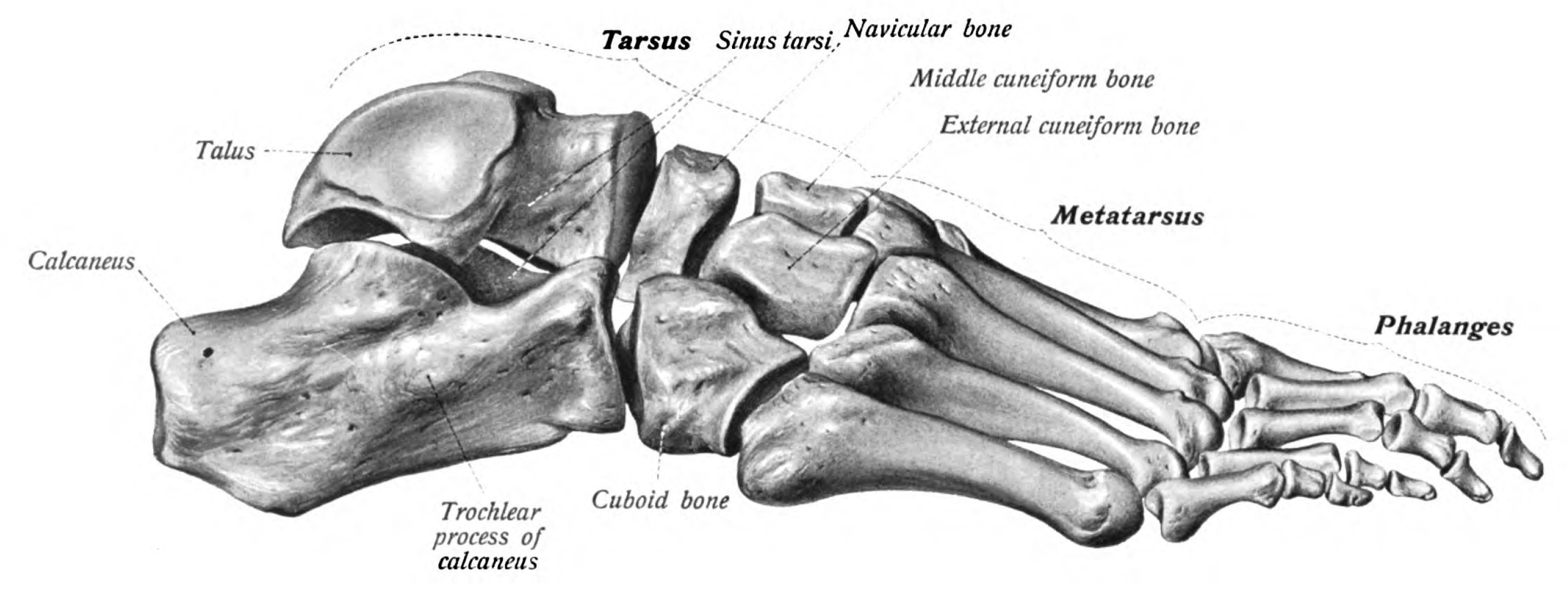
- A medical diagram of the foot bones, with the sinus tarsi labeled (upper right; next to Tarsus label)
- Specialty: Orthopedics, podiatry
- Symptoms: Pain or tenderness in the sinus tarsi
- Causes: Ankle sprain; pronation; flat foot; excessive physical activity; PTTD
- Diagnostic method: Physical examination
- Treatment: Physical therapy, orthotics, anti-inflammatories, steroids

Sinus tarsi syndrome is the clinical disorder of pain and tenderness in the sinus tarsi, which is a lateral tunnel in the foot at the junction of the hindfoot and the midfoot, between the ankle and the heel. Most of the time, sinus tarsi syndrome onsets after ankle sprains; however, there can be other causes. There are a variety of treatments, divided into conservative treatments such as physical and orthotic therapy, and more invasive ones such as cortisone injections. The condition is somewhat poorly understood and is subject to heavy debate in the medical community.

== Causes ==
Sinus tarsi syndrome can have a variety of causes. The most common is an inversion (rolling out) ankle sprain, which makes up 70–80% of cases, followed by pronation of the foot, which is responsible for about 20–30% of cases. More rarely, excessive physical activity and other forms of foot trauma/chronic ankle injury are thought to be the cause.

In the case of posterior tibial tendon dysfunction causing flatfoot, sinus tarsi syndrome can also develop due to the disruption in the entire structure of the foot.

The condition is also thought to be caused by ankle/subtalar joint instability causing inflammation in the area.

== Symptoms ==
Sinus tarsi syndrome is characterized by pain, tenderness, and instability/aggravation of the pain when walking on uneven surfaces or during weight-bearing activity. The pain will be also aggravated by inversion (turning in) and eversion (turning out). Looseness of the ankle and foot joints can also occur. There is also often the presence of ligament tears, arthrofibrosis, ganglion cysts, or degeneration of the joints. Occasionally, peroneal spasms, valgus hindfoot, and limited varus motion can also be present.

== Diagnosis ==
X-ray can show some impingement in the sinus tarsi area. Other diagnostic tests include: bone scans, CT scans, and MRI evaluation. Doctors may inject local anesthetic to localize the problem to the sinus tarsi. Radiopharmaceuticals can also be used to identify inflammation. Ankle arthroscopy may also be used to locate damaged tissue. Diagnosis is often a process of elimination as sinus tarsi syndrome is rarely a definitive disorder.

== Treatment ==
=== Conservative treatments ===
Conservative (non-surgical) treatments are often considered first. Possible treatments include:

- Period of immobilization (rest)
- Activity moderation
- Supportive footwear
- Ankle sleeves/braces
- Orthotic therapy
- Anti-inflammatory medication
- Physical therapy

However, while conservative treatments are often effect, resistant cases may require more invasive treatments such as:

- Corticosteroid injections into the tarsal canal
- Oral steroids
- Custom orthoses
- Cryotherapy

These forms of treatment, while being invasive and expensive, are known to be very effective.

=== Surgical treatments ===
Surgical treatments are very rare and reserved for highly resistant cases. Surgery can be open (via an incision) or closed (via arthroscopy). In cases of flatfoot, sinus tarsi syndrome is complicated by the collapse of the arches. In these cases, surgery includes debridement (cleaning out) of the sinus tarsi and possible reconstruction of the foot. Surgery can also include debridement of bone spurs as well.

In cases where joint insufficiency causes the syndrome, surgery is often very effective.

== Prognosis ==
If treated, sinus tarsi syndrome has an excellent prognosis. Full recovery is to be expected, though some patients will need rehabilitation. However, relapse can occasionally occur, especially if only conservative treatments are undergone. Sinus tarsi syndrome can be misdiagnosed as a chronic ankle sprain. Untreated sinus tarsi syndrome can develop into chronic ankle pain and disability.

== History ==
Sinus tarsi syndrome was first studied by Dr. Denis O'Connor in 1957. O'Connor claimed conservative treatment was ineffective and surgery was the only effective option, describing a surgery in which the surgeon resects the superficial ligamentous floor and cleans out the fat pad. O'Connor claimed all 14 patients this surgery was performed on reported relief of their symptoms. While there is not a lot of consensus in the medical community (and the disorder continues to be understudied), other treatment options, including conservative treatments, have been to proven to be viable in the time since.

Since its first description, the causes of the syndrome have also been in dispute. In 1960, Brown proposed that herniation caused the pain and discomfort associated with the syndrome. In 1981, Taillard et al describes ligament tearing as a cause. Further on, Schwarzenbach et al described scarring around the veins to be the source of pain.

== See also ==
- Tarsal tunnel syndrome
