= Quadratus plantae muscle =

Muscles of the sole of the foot

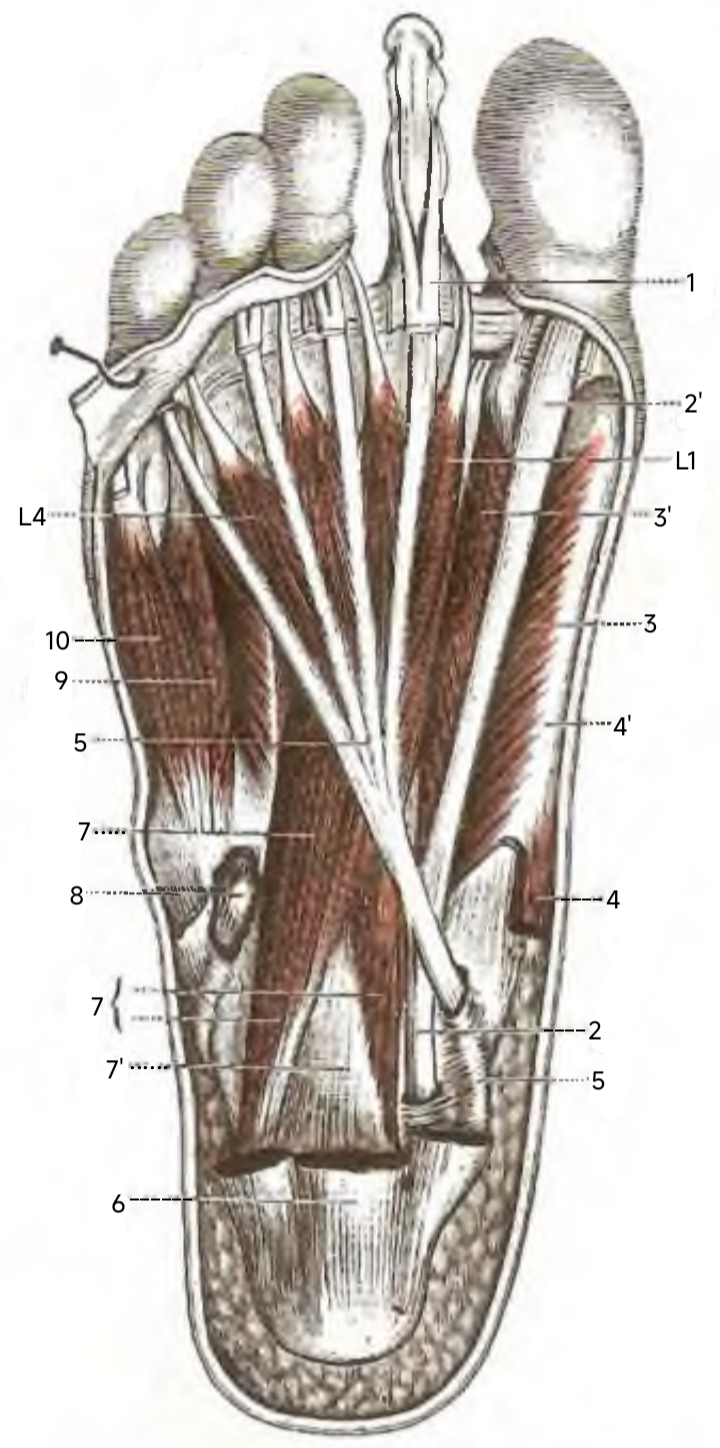
- Muscles of the sole of the right foot. Second layer. Inferior view. Quadratus plantae is labeled 7. Long plantar ligament is labeled 7'. Flexor digitorum longus tendon is labeled 5. (After Testut's Anatomy.)

Details
- Origin: Calcaneus, long plantar ligament
- Insertion: Tendons of flexor digitorum longus
- Nerve: Lateral plantar nerve (S1, 2)
- Actions: Assists flexor digitorum longus in flexion of DIP joints

Identifiers
- Latin: musculus quadratus plantae
- TA98: A04.7.02.068
- TA2: 2684
- FMA: 37452

The quadratus plantae (historically known as flexor accessorius) is separated from the muscles of the first layer by the lateral plantar vessels and nerve. It acts to aid in flexing the 2nd to 5th toes (offsetting the oblique pull of the flexor digitorum longus) and is one of the few muscles in the foot with no homolog in the hand.

== Origin and insertion ==
It originates by two heads, which are separated from each other by the long plantar ligament: the medial or larger head is muscular, and is attached to the medial concave surface of the calcaneus, below the groove which transmits the tendon of the flexor hallucis longus; the lateral head, flat and tendinous, arises from the lateral border of the inferior surface of the calcaneus, in front of the lateral process of its tuberosity, and from the long plantar ligament.

The two portions join at an acute angle, and end in a flattened band which is inserted into the lateral margin and upper and under surfaces of the tendon of the flexor digitorum longus, forming a kind of groove, in which the tendon is lodged. It usually sends slips to those tendons of the flexor digitorum longus which pass to the second, third, and fourth toes.

== Variations ==
Lateral head often wanting; entire muscle absent. Variation in the number of digital tendons to which fibers can be traced. Most frequent offsets are sent to the second, third and fourth toes; in many cases to the fifth as well; occasionally to two toes only.

== Additional images ==
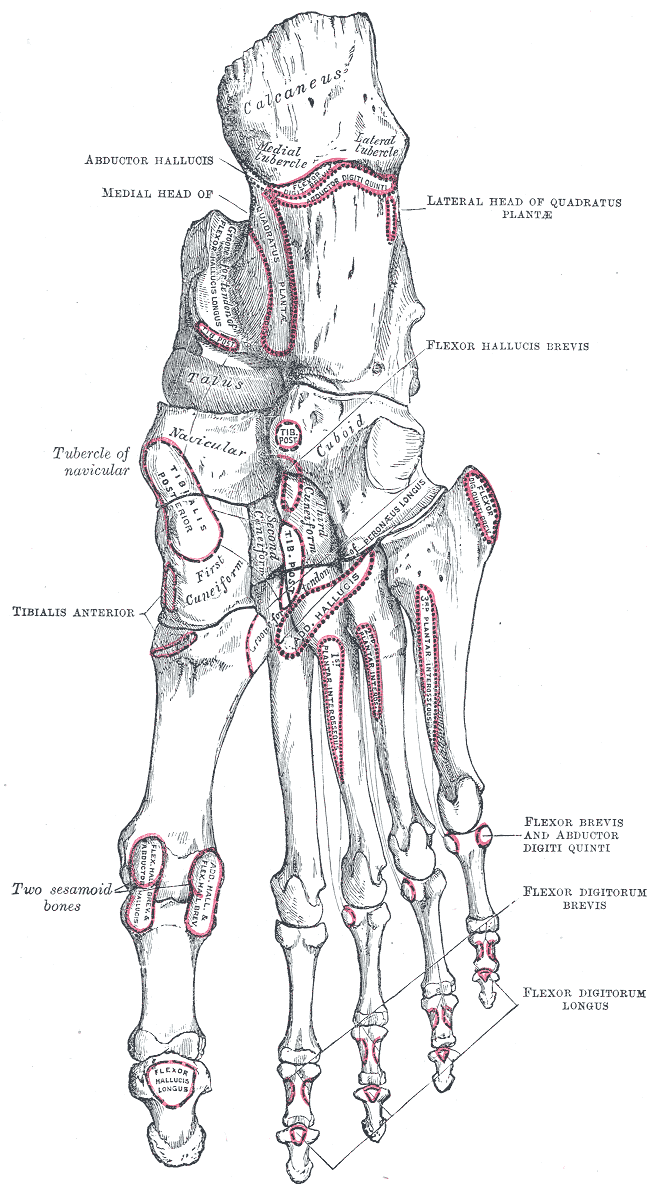
Bones of the right foot. Plantar surface.

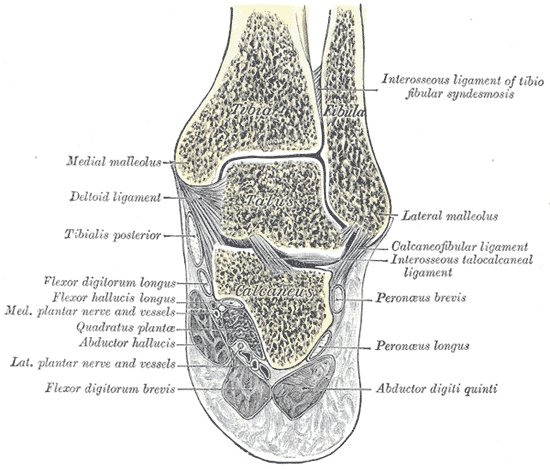
Coronal section through right talocrural and talocalcaneal joints

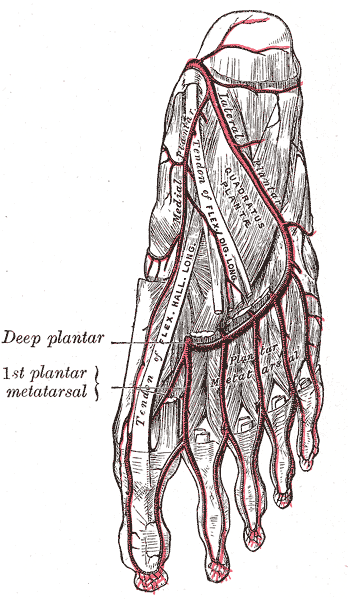
The plantar arteries. Deep view. (Quadratus plantae visible at center.)

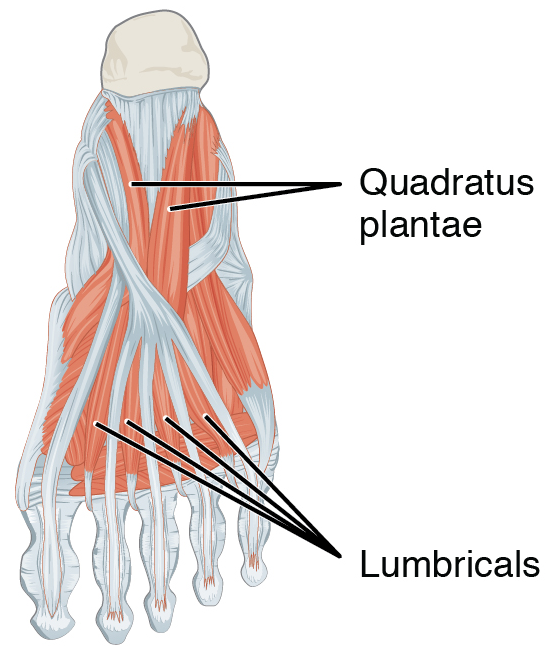
The quadratus plantae aids in flexion of the toes
