= Plantar calcaneocuboid ligament =

Ligament of the foot

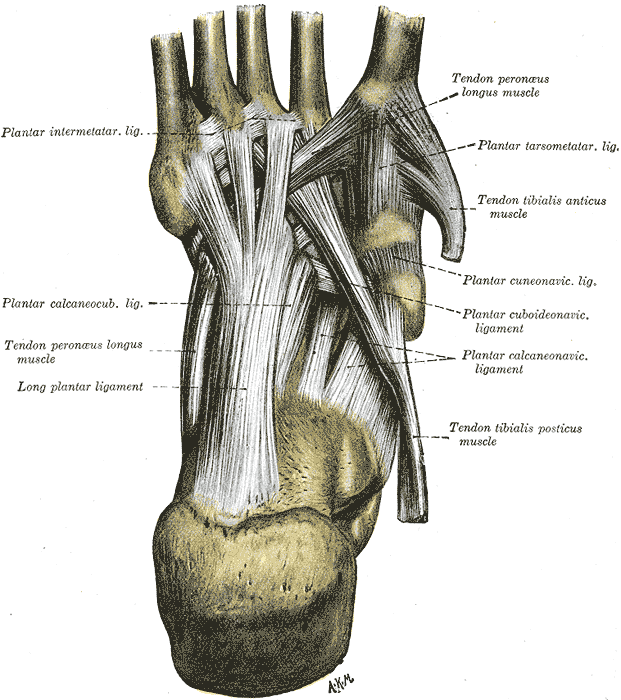
- Ligaments of the sole of the right foot, with the tendons of the peronæus longus, tibialis posterior and tibialis anterior muscles. (Plantar calcaneocuboid labeled at center left.)

Details
- From: calcaneus
- To: cuboid

Identifiers
- Latin: ligamentum calcaneocuboideum plantare
- TA98: A03.6.10.518
- TA2: 1940
- FMA: 44251

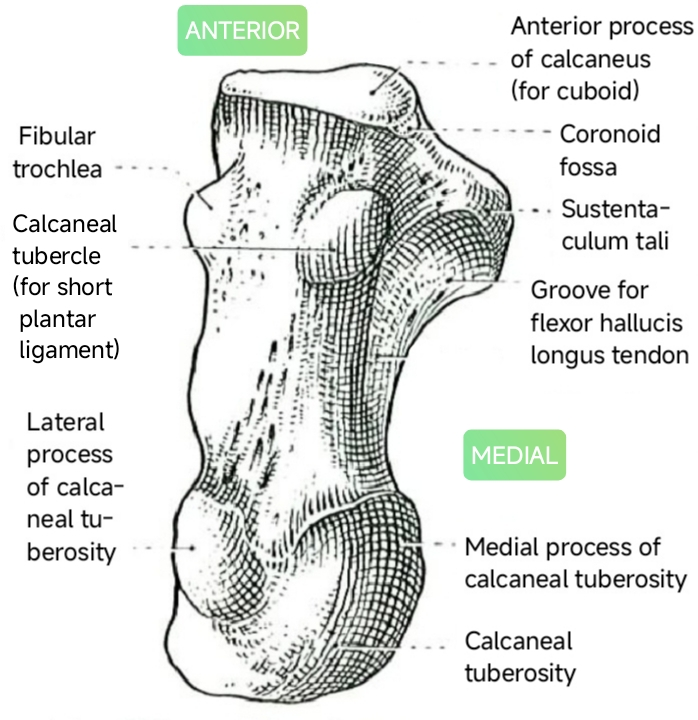
Inferior (plantar) view of a right calcaneus, showing the calcaneal tubercle. (After Charpy.)

The plantar calcaneocuboid ligament (short calcaneocuboid ligament or short plantar ligament) is a ligament on the bottom of the foot that connects the calcaneus to the cuboid bone. It lies deep to the long plantar ligament.

== Structure ==
The plantar calcaneocuboid ligament lies nearer to the bones than the long plantar ligament, from which it is separated by a little areolar tissue.

It is a short but wide band of great strength, and extends from the calcaneal tubercle (sin. anterior tubercle of calcaneus) and the depression in front of it, on the forepart of the plantar surface of the calcaneus, to the plantar surface of the cuboid posterior to the groove for the fibularis longus tendon.

== See also ==
- Arches of the foot
- Long plantar ligament
- Plantar calcaneonavicular ligament
