= P4HTM =

Protein-coding gene in the species Homo sapiens

Identifiers
- Aliases: P4HTM, EGLN4, HIFPH4, P4H-TM, PH-4, PH4, PHD4, prolyl 4-hydroxylase, transmembrane, HIDEA
- External IDs: OMIM: 614584; MGI: 1921693; GeneCards: P4HTM
Enzyme activity
EC #	BRENDA	ExPASy	KEGG	MetaCyc
1.14.11.29	↗	↗	↗	↗

Gene location (Human)
Chr.	Chromosome 3 (human)
Band	3p21.31|3p21.3	Start	48,989,889 bp
Band	3p21.31|3p21.3	End	49,007,153 bp

Gene location (Mouse)
Chr.	Chromosome 9 (mouse)
Band	9|9 F2	Start	108,456,061 bp
Band	9|9 F2	End	108,474,866 bp
RNA expression pattern
Bgee	Human / Mouse (ortholog); Top expressed in: right uterine tube; bronchial epithelial cell; pituitary gland; anterior pituitary; prefrontal cortex; right frontal lobe; right hemisphere of cerebellum; Brodmann area 9; nucleus accumbens; anterior cingulate cortex / Top expressed in: substantia nigra; nucleus accumbens; temporal lobe; facial motor nucleus; prefrontal cortex; ventromedial nucleus; central gray substance of midbrain; lateral septal nucleus; anterior amygdaloid area; paraventricular nucleus of hypothalamus; More reference expression data
BioGPS	n/a
Gene ontology
Molecular function	2-oxoglutarate-dependent dioxygenase activity; iron ion binding; L-ascorbic acid binding; oxidoreductase activity; dioxygenase activity; oxidoreductase activity, acting on paired donors, with incorporation or reduction of molecular oxygen; metal ion binding; calcium ion binding; procollagen-proline 4-dioxygenase activity
Cellular component	integral component of membrane; endoplasmic reticulum membrane; endoplasmic reticulum; membrane
Biological process	regulation of erythrocyte differentiation; peptidyl-proline hydroxylation to 4-hydroxy-L-proline
Sources:Amigo / QuickGO
Orthologs
Databases	NCBI: entry; OMA: entry
Species	Human	Mouse
Entrez	54681	74443
Ensembl	ENSG00000178467	ENSMUSG00000006675
UniProt	Q9NXG6	Q8BG58
RefSeq (mRNA)	NM_017732; NM_177938; NM_177939	NM_028944; NM_001357465
RefSeq (protein)	NP_808807; NP_808808	NP_083220; NP_001344394
Location (UCSC)	Chr 3: 48.99 – 49.01 Mb	Chr 9: 108.46 – 108.47 Mb
PubMed search
- Wikidata
View/Edit Human	View/Edit Mouse

Prolyl 4-hydroxylase, transmembrane is a protein that in humans is encoded by the P4HTM gene.

== Function ==
The product of this gene belongs to the family of prolyl 4-hydroxylases. This protein is a prolyl hydroxylase that may be involved in the degradation of hypoxia-inducible transcription factors under normoxia. It plays a role in adaptation to hypoxia and may be related to cellular oxygen sensing. Alternatively spliced variants encoding different isoforms have been identified.
