= Planovalgus deformity =

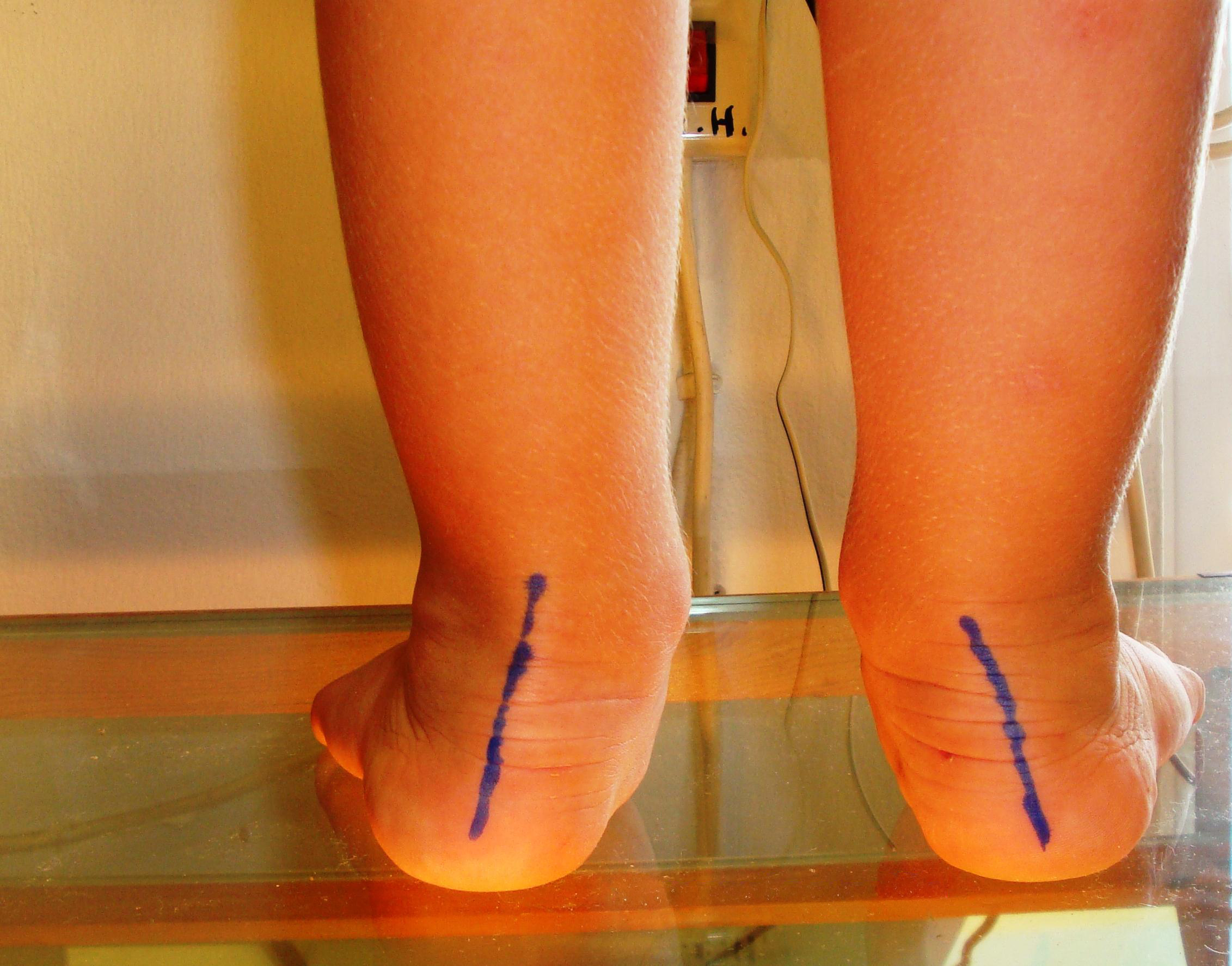
Flat feet with planovalgus deformity

Planovalgus deformity is a postural deformity, flat foot typology, very frequent in people with cerebral palsy and often due to muscle imbalance resulting in a predominance of the pronotory versus the supinatory forces.

== Treatment ==
Surgical treatment in the presence of planovalgus deformity can be of two types:

- Grice-Viladot technique, which is performed if the patient is over 8 years old.
- Dual arthrodesis technique, which is performed if the patient is over 12 years old.

Both techniques provide for a thirty-day subsequent protection with a plastered knee-high without load.

== Bibliography ==
- (in Italian) P.F. Costici, R. Russo: Il piede piatto neurogeno in Il piede piatto infantile ISBN 9788854867772
- P.F. Costici, R. Russo, O. Palmacci: surgical techniques for pes planovalgus deformity in cerebral palsy in Journal of Orthopaedics and Traumatology
