= Long plantar ligament =

Ligament that connects the calcaneus and cuboid bones in the human foot

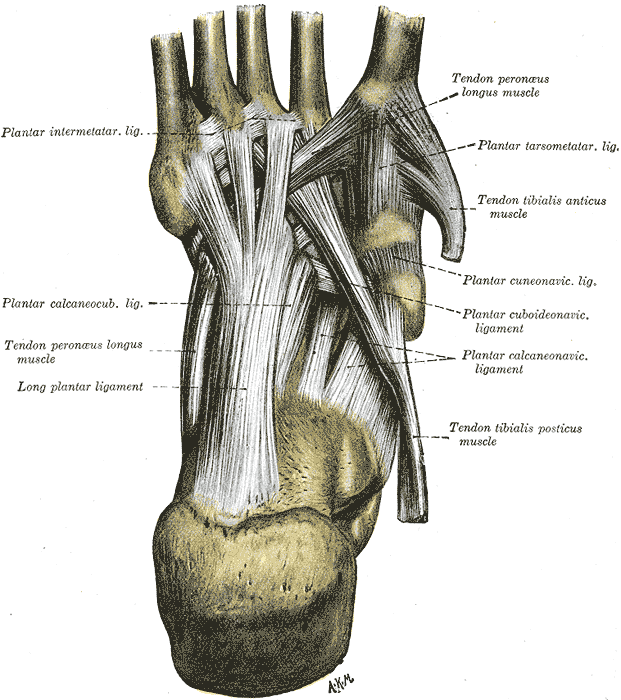
- Ligaments of the sole of the foot, with the tendons of the Peronæus longus, Tibialis posterior and Tibialis anterior muscles. (Long plantar ligament is bottom label at left.)

Details
- From: calcaneus
- To: second metatarsal to fifth metatarsal

Identifiers
- Latin: ligamentum plantare longum
- TA98: A03.6.10.517
- TA2: 1934
- FMA: 44248

The long plantar ligament (long calcaneocuboid ligament; superficial long plantar ligament) is a long ligament on the underside of the foot that connects the calcaneus with the 2nd to 5th metatarsal.

== Structure ==
The long plantar ligament is the longest of all the ligaments of the tarsus. It is attached behind to the plantar surface of the calcaneus in front of the tuberosity, and in front to the tuberosity on the plantar surface of the cuboid bone, the more superficial fibers being continued forward to the bases of the second, third, and fourth metatarsal bones.

This ligament converts the groove on the plantar surface of the cuboid into a canal for the tendon of the fibularis longus.

Deep to this ligament is the short plantar ligament.

The long plantar ligament separates the two heads of the quadratus plantae muscle.

== See also ==
- Plantar calcaneonavicular ligament
- Short plantar ligament
