= Sinus tarsi =

Section of the hindfoot

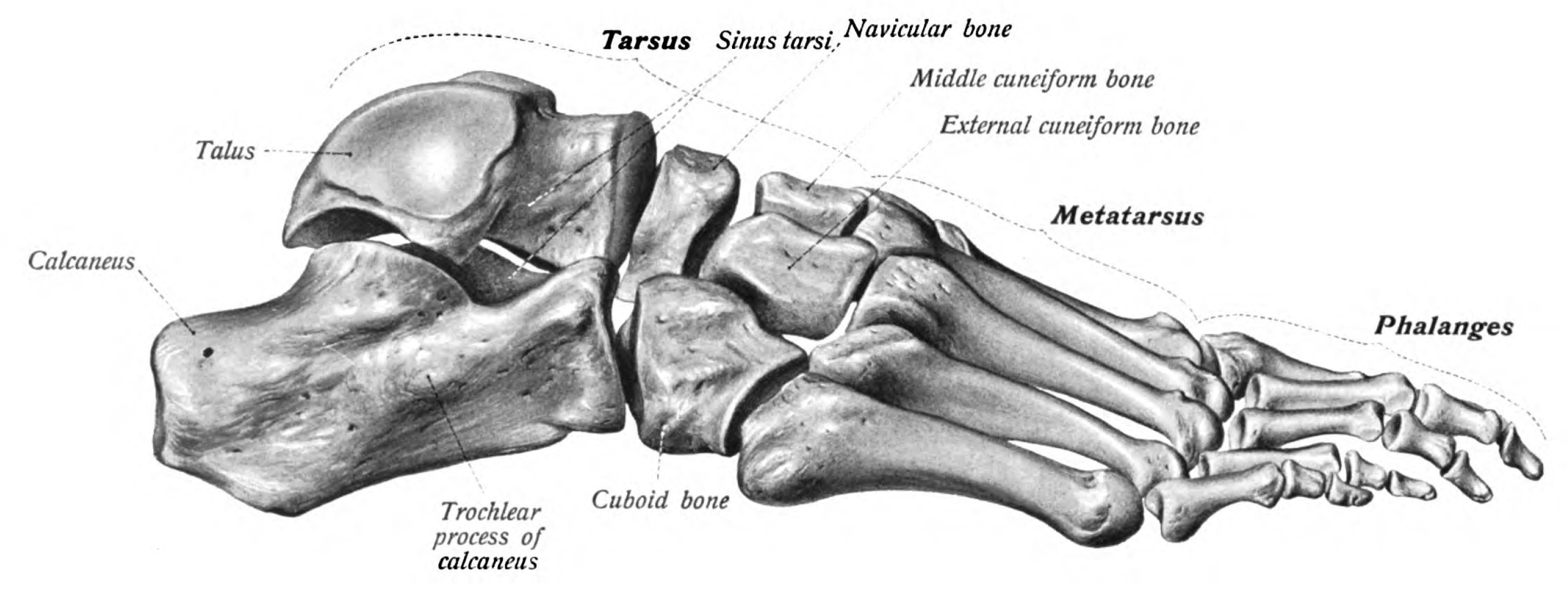
- A labeled diagram of the foot bones, with the sinus tarsi labeled (upper right; next to Tarsus label)
- Synonyms: Talocalcaneal sulcus

Identifiers
- TA98: A02.5.11.009
- TA2: 1476
- FMA: 35138

The sinus tarsi, also known as the talocalcaneal sulcus, is a cylindrical canal in the hindfoot. It has a complex anatomy, with five ligamentous structures and a pad of adipose tissue (fat). The tarsal canal opens up into the sinus tarsi, however, the tarsal canal is a distinct structure.

== Structure ==
The sinus tarsi located in the hindfoot, it is contained by the calcaneus, talus, talocalcaneonavicular joint, and the bottom of the subtalar joint. There are five ligamentous structures present inside it: the intermediate, medial, and lateral roots of the inferior extensor retinaculum; the cervical ligament, and the interosseous talocalcaneal ligament. There is also a pad of adipose tissue. The tarsal canal also opens up into the sinus tarsi.

== Physiology ==
The sinus tarsi helps stabilize the ankle, as the cervical ligament limits inversion of the (turning in) and the interosseous talocalcaneal ligament limits eversion (turning out).

== Clinical significance ==
Prior to the discovery of sinus tarsi syndrome, the sinus tarsi was not well studied and was seen as irrelevant.

=== Sinus tarsi syndrome ===
Sinus tarsi syndrome is a clinical disorder of pain and tenderness in the sinus tarsi. This disorder can have a variety of causes; however, the most common is an inversion ankle sprain.

=== Surgery access ===
In recent years, approaching a displaced intra-articular calcaneus fracture via the sinus tarsi during surgery has been found to be more efficient in reconstructing the bone and less invasive, preserving soft tissue around the bone.
