= Arches of the foot =

Load-bearing curves in the tarsal and metatarsal bones of the feet

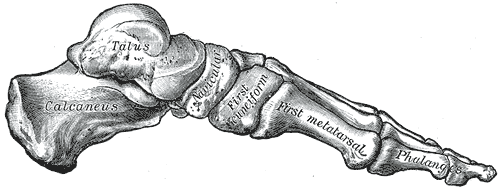
- Skeleton of foot. Medial aspect.

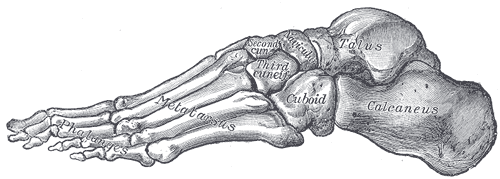
- Skeleton of foot. Lateral aspect.

Details

Identifiers
- Latin: arcus pedis

The arches of the foot, formed by the tarsal and metatarsal bones, strengthened by ligaments and tendons, allow the foot to support the weight of the body in the erect posture with the least weight.

They are categorized as longitudinal and transverse arches.

== Structure ==
=== Longitudinal arches ===
The longitudinal arches of the foot can be divided into medial and lateral arches.

==== Medial arch ====
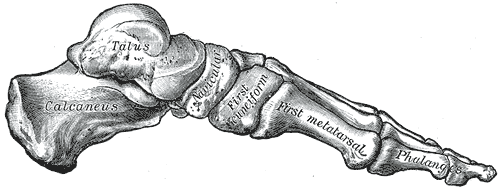
Skeleton of foot. Medial aspect.

The medial arch is higher than the lateral longitudinal arch. It is made up by the calcaneus, the talus, the navicular, the three cuneiforms (medial, intermediate, and lateral), and the first, second, and third metatarsals.

Its summit is at the superior articular surface of the talus, and its two extremities or piers, on which it rests in standing, are the tuberosity on the plantar surface of the calcaneus posteriorly and the heads of the first, second, and third metatarsal bones anteriorly. The chief characteristic of this arch is its elasticity, due to its height and to the number of small joints between its component parts.

Its weakest part (i.e., the part most liable to yield from overpressure) is the joint between the talus and navicular, but this portion is braced by the plantar calcaneonavicular ligament a.k.a. spring ligament, which is elastic and is thus able to quickly restore the arch to its original condition when the disturbing force is removed. The ligament is strengthened medially by blending with the deltoid ligament of the ankle joint, and is supported inferiorly by the tendon of the tibialis posterior, which is spread out in a fanshaped insertion and prevents undue tension of the ligament or such an amount of stretching as would permanently elongate it.

The arch is further supported by the plantar aponeurosis, by the small muscles in the sole of the foot (short muscles of the big toe), by the tendons of the tibialis anterior and posterior and fibularis longus, flexor digitorum longus, flexor hallucis longus and by the ligaments of all the articulations involved.

==== Lateral arch ====
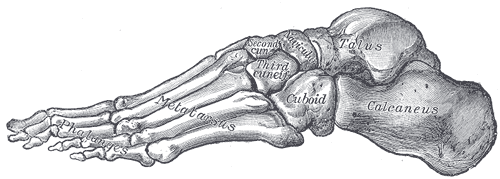
Skeleton of foot. Lateral aspect.

The lateral arch is composed of the calcaneus, the cuboid, and the fourth and fifth metatarsals.

Two notable features of this arch are its solidity and its slight elevation. Two strong ligaments, the long plantar and the plantar calcaneocuboid, together with the extensor tendons and the short muscles of the little toe, preserve its integrity.

==== Fundamental longitudinal arch ====
While these medial and lateral arches may be readily demonstrated as the component antero-posterior arches of the foot, the fundamental longitudinal arch is contributed to by both, and consists of the calcaneus, cuboid, third cuneiform, and third metatarsal: all the other bones of the foot may be removed without destroying this arch.

=== Transversal arch ===
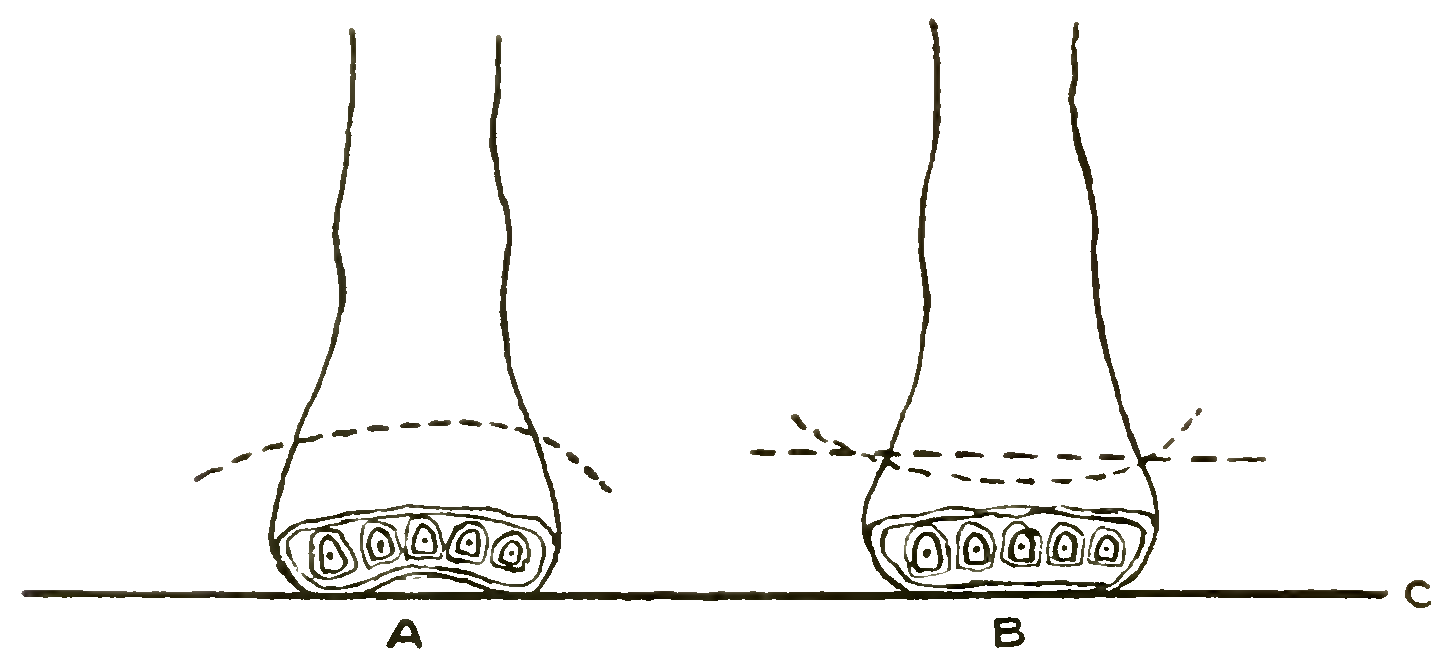
Cross section of feet showing metatarsal bones forming anterior arch: A = normal position, B = flattened arch

In addition to the longitudinal arches the foot presents a series of transverse arches.

At the posterior part of the metatarsus and the anterior part of the tarsus the arches are complete, but in the middle of the tarsus they present more the characters of half-domes, the concavities of which are directed downward and medialward, so that when the medial borders of the feet are placed in apposition a complete tarsal dome is formed. The transverse arch is composed of the three cuneiforms, the cuboid, and the five metatarsal bases. The transverse arch is strengthened by the interosseous, plantar, and dorsal ligaments, by the short muscles of the first and fifth toes (especially the transverse head of the adductor hallucis), and by the fibularis longus, whose tendon stretches across between the piers of the arches.

== Function ==
The medial longitudinal arch in particular creates a space for soft tissues with elastic properties, which act as springs, particularly the thick plantar aponeurosis, passing from the heel to the toes. Because of their elastic properties, these soft tissues can spread ground contact reaction forces over a longer time period, and thus reduce the risk of musculoskeletal wear or damage, and they can also store the energy of these forces, returning it at the next step and thus reducing the cost of walking and, particularly, running, where vertical forces are higher.

== Clinical significance ==
Research shows that men are more likely to have arched feet than women, and studies have reported that women are more likely to have flat feet than men. Women who do have arched feet who experience pregnancy and may experience a flattening of their arched feet, as the surge of female sex hormones such as estrogen can cause the tendons in their feet to soften and relax, to the extent that their arched feet become flat.

The anatomy and shape of a person's longitudinal and transverse arch can dictate the types of injuries to which that person is susceptible. The height of a person's arch is determined by the height of the navicular bone. Collapse of the longitudinal arches results in what is known as flat feet. A person with a low longitudinal arch, or flat feet will likely stand and walk with their feet in a pronated position, where the foot everts or rolls inward. This makes the person susceptible to heel pain, arch pain and plantar fasciitis. Flat footed people may also have more difficulty performing exercises that require supporting their weight on their toes.

People who have high longitudinal arches or a cavus foot tend to walk and stand with their feet in a supinated position where the foot inverts or rolls outward. High arches can also cause plantar fasciitis as they cause the plantar fascia to be stretched away from the calcaneus or heel bone. Additionally, high or low arches can increase the risk of shin splints as the anterior tibialis must work harder to keep the foot from slapping the ground.

== Evolution and other animals ==
The non-human apes (the gibbons, gorillas, orangutans, chimpanzees and bonobos) tend to walk on the lateral side of the foot, that is with an 'inverted' foot, which may reflect a basic adaptation to walking on branches. It is often held that their feet lack longitudinal arches, but footprints made by bipedally walking apes, which must directly or indirectly reflect the pressure they exert to support and propel themselves do suggest that they exert lower foot pressure under the medial part of their midfoot.

However, human feet, and the human medial longitudinal arch, differ in that the anterior part of the foot is medially twisted on the posterior part of the foot, so that all the toes may contact the ground at the same time, and the twisting is so marked that the most medial toe, the big toe or hallux, (in some individuals the second toe) tends to exert the greatest propulsive force in walking and running. This gives the human foot an 'everted' or relatively outward-facing appearance compared to that of other apes. The strong twisting of the anterior part of the human foot on the posterior part tends to increase the height of the medial longitudinal arch. However, there is now considerable evidence that shoe-wearing also accentuates the height of the medial longitudinal arch and that the height of the medial longitudinal arch also differs very considerably between individuals and at different speeds.

The presence of high-arched feet in modern humans is a result of natural selection for long-distance running. On the other hand, the primitive trait of arch-less feet in our great ape relatives has been maintained because of selection for grasping tree branches as a part of their arboreal lifestyle. Divergence between ape feet and human feet began with the early human ancestor Ardipithecus ramidus, when strengthened plantar tissue evolved, which supported early terrestrial propulsion before evolving a true arch. However, the skeletal longitudinal arch structure itself did not begin to evolve until Australopithecus afarensis had evolved a relatively low longitudinal arch (compared to modern humans) and the first signs of a transverse arch accompanying it.

It is not yet agreed to what extent the early human ancestor Australopithecus afarensis, (3.75 million years ago onwards) had acquired a functionally human-like foot, but the medial twist of the forefoot evident in fossil footbones of this species, and in the Laetoli footprint trail in Tanzania generally attributed to this species, certainly appears less marked than is evident in fossil footbones of Homo erectus (sometimes called Homo georgicus) from Dmanisi, Georgia (c. 1. 8 million years ago) and the roughly contemporaneous fossil footprint trail at Ileret, Kenya attributed to Homo erectus ergaster.

== See also ==
- Pes cavus
- Flat feet
- Arch support
- Comparison of orthotics
- Foot gymnastics

== Bibliography ==
- Allen (1997). "Subfossil mammalian tracks (Flandrian) in the Severn estuary, S.W. Britain: mechanics of formation, preservation and distribution". Philosophical Transactions of the Royal Society of London. 352 (1352): 481–518. Bibcode:1997RSPTB.352..481A. doi:10.1098/rstb.1997.0035. PMC 1691943.
- Bennett; et al. (February 2009). "Early Hominin Foot Morphology Based on 1.5-Million-Year-Old Footprints from Ileret, Kenya" (PDF). Science. 323 (5918): 1197–1201. Bibcode:2009Sci...323.1197B. doi:10.1126/science.1168132. PMID 19251625. S2CID 10861457.
- D'Août; et al. (2009). "Experimentally Generated Footprints in Sand: Analysis and Consequences for the Interpretation of Fossil and Forensic Footprints". American Journal of Physical Anthropology. 141 (4): 515–525. doi:10.1002/ajpa.21169. PMID 19927372.
- D'Août; et al. (2009). "The effects of habitual footwear use:foot shape and function in native barefoot walkers". Footwear Science. 1 (2): 81–94. doi:10.1080/19424280903386411. S2CID 56238052.
- Harcourt-Smith; Aiello (May 2004). "Fossils, feet and the evolution of human bipedal locomotion". Journal of Anatomy. 204 (5): 403–416. doi:10.1111/j.0021-8782.2004.00296.x. PMC 1571304. PMID 15198703.
- Ker, R. F.; Bennett, M. B.; Bibby, S. R.; Kester, R. C.; Alexander, R. M. (1987). "The spring in the arch of the human foot". Nature. 325 (7000): 147–49. Bibcode:1987Natur.325..147K. doi:10.1038/325147a0. PMID 3808070. S2CID 4358258.
- MacConaill, M. A. (1944–1945). "The Postural Mechanism of the Human Foot". Proceedings of the Royal Irish Academy. 50B. Royal Irish Academy: 265–78. JSTOR 20490838.
- Pataky; et al. (2008). "New insights into the plantar pressure correlates of walking speed using pedobarographic statistical parametric mapping (pSPM)". Journal of Biomechanics. 41 (9): 1987–1994. doi:10.1016/j.jbiomech.2008.03.034. PMID 18501364.
- Pontzer; et al. (June 2010). "Locomotor anatomy and biomechanics of the Dmanisi hominins" (PDF). Journal of Human Evolution. 58 (6): 492–504. Bibcode:2010JHumE..58..492P. doi:10.1016/j.jhevol.2010.03.006. PMID 20447679. Archived from the original (PDF) on 2020-02-26.
