= Foot gymnastics =

Games and exercises for feet and legs

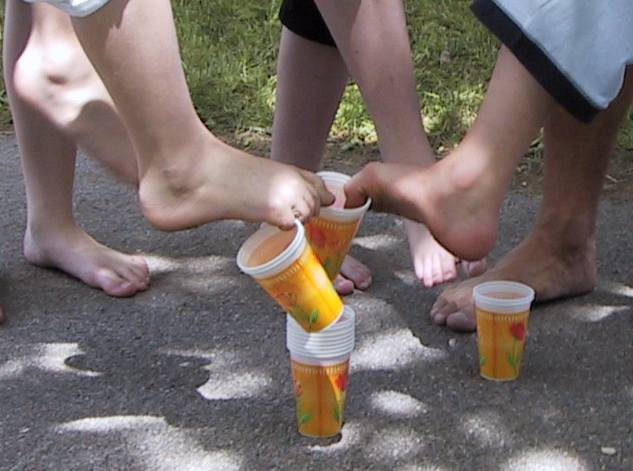
Foot gymnastic games

Knotting ropes with feet

Foot training with a stick

Foot gymnastics are games and exercises intended to strengthen the muscles of the legs and feet, improve motion sequences during walking and sports, support therapy of varicose veins, and back pain. Such activities are recommended to improve flat feet, especially in children, and to enhance gait performance in older adults.
