= Calcaneal pitch =

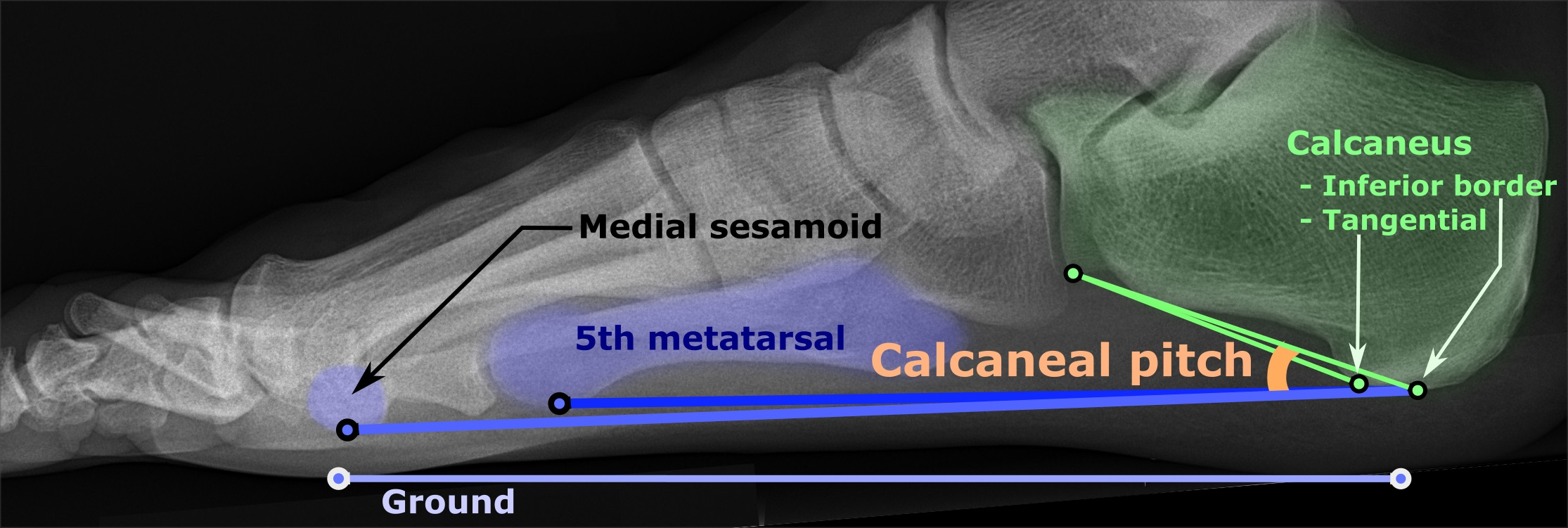
Calcaneal pitch annotated in orange/yellow, with its various defining points included

The calcaneal pitch is an angle used mainly in the diagnosis and severity grading of flat feet and pes cavus.

== Measurement ==
Calcaneal pitch is an angle of the calcaneus and the inferior aspect of the foot, with different sources giving different reference points. The first line making up the angle is defined as either:

- The calcaneal inclination axis, extending from the calcaneus by the inferior portion of the calcaneocuboid joint to the inferior border of the calcaneus.
- Tangential to the inferior distal border of the calcaneus.

The second line is defined as extending from either of the two above to either of the following:

- The inferior border of the head of the fifth metatarsal bone.
- The inferior aspect of the medial sesamoid bone.
- Parallel to the ground.

== Interpretation ==
Calcaneal pitch is increased in pes cavus, with cutoffs ranging from 20° to 32°. A calcaneal pitch of less than 17° or 18° indicates flat feet.
