= Forefoot =

The forefoot is the anterior aspect of the foot, composed of the five metatarsal bones, the fourteen phalanges and associated soft tissue structures. It is a common site of pathology in podiatry, and is the anatomic region involved in such conditions as hallux valgus, hallux rigidus, and Morton's neuroma, among others. In cases of severe deformity, such as in Charcot joints seen with diabetic neuropathy, the forefoot can be reconstructed by arthroplasty.
