= Flat feet =

Foot arch deformity

- Other names: Pes planus, fallen arches
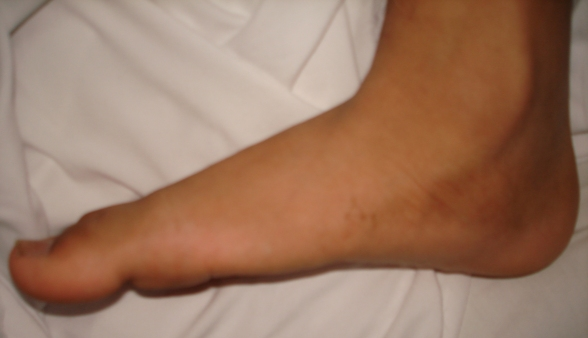
- Specialty: Orthopedics Podiatry

Flat feet, also called pes planus (Latin: "flat foot") or fallen arches, is a postural deformity in which the arches of the foot collapse, with the entire sole of the foot coming into complete or near-complete contact with the ground. Sometimes flat feet are congenital, but they can also develop in childhood or adulthood.

The structure of the arch of the foot has a functional relationship with the biomechanics of the leg. The arches provide an elastic, springy connection between the forefoot and the hind foot, and can normally dissipate the majority of the forces incurred by bearing weight on the foot before they reach the long bones of the leg.

In an individual with pes planus, the head of the talus bone is displaced medially and distally from the navicular bone. As a result, the plantar calcaneonavicular ligament (spring ligament) and the tendon of the tibialis posterior muscle are stretched to such an extent that the medial longitudinal arch (MLA) is lost. If the arch is present and functional while the individual is sitting or standing up on their toes, but disappears when assuming a foot-flat stance, the individual has "supple" flatfoot. This condition is often treated with arch supports. If the arch is absent or nonfunctional in both positions, the individual has "rigid" flatfoot.

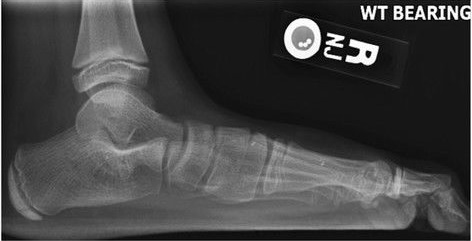
Lateral X-ray of a flat foot with C-sign, which is a bony bridge between the talar dome and sustentaculum tali, in combination with a prominent inferior border of the sustentaculum tali. This represents a talocalcaneal coalition, which is an abnormal connection between the talus and calcaneus and is thought to cause the flat foot deformity in this case.

== Children ==
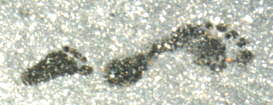
Flat feet in children (left footprint) normally develop into normal high arches (right footprint).

Flat feet are a common occurrence in children and adolescents. The human arch develops in infancy and early childhood as part of normal muscle, tendon, ligament and bone growth. Flat arches in children usually become high arches as the child progresses through adolescence and into adulthood.

Children with flat feet are at a higher risk of developing knee, hip, and back pain. A 2007 randomized controlled trial found no evidence for the efficacy of treatment of flat feet in children either from expensive prescribed orthotics (i.e. shoe inserts) or less expensive over-the-counter orthotics. As a symptom itself, flat feet usually accompany genetic musculoskeletal conditions such as dyspraxia, ligamentous laxity or hypermobility.

=== Diagnosis ===
Children rarely complain of flat feet, so the condition is usually identified by adult caregivers. It may be identified via a visual inspection of the feet, an unusual pattern of shoe tread wear, observing an abnormal gait, or noticing that the child seems to be in pain from walking. Children who complain about calf muscle pains, arch pain, or any other pains around the foot area may be developing or have developed flat feet.

=== Risk factors ===
A systematic review and meta-analysis study by Xu, et.al., found that urban sedentary boys, aged 6–9, were frequently diagnosed with flat feet. The researchers also explored and listed additional risk factors that played a role in flat feet. Ligament laxity is also among the factors known to be associated with flat feet.

=== Prevention and treatment ===
Training of the feet, utilizing foot gymnastics and going barefoot on varying terrain, can facilitate the formation of arches during childhood, with a developed arch occurring for most by the age of four to six years.

One cross-sectional study performed on children in India focused on the influence of footwear on the prevalence of pes planus. It had a large sample size of children who had grown up wearing shoes and others who had gone barefoot. The study found that the longitudinal arches were generally strongest and highest in the barefoot group, but that flat feet were less common in children who had grown up wearing sandals or slippers than among those who had worn closed-toe shoes. The study noted that wearing shoes throughout early childhood can be detrimental to the development of a normal or a high medial longitudinal arch. The vulnerability for flat foot among shoe-wearing children increases if the child has an associated ligament laxity condition. The results of the study suggest that children be encouraged to play barefooted on various surfaces of terrain and that slippers and sandals are less harmful compared to closed-toe shoes. It appeared that closed-toe shoes greatly inhibited the development of the arch of the foot more so than slippers or sandals. This may be because intrinsic muscle activity of the arch is required to prevent slippers and sandals from falling off the child's foot.

In children with few symptoms, orthotics are not recommended.

== Adults ==
Flat feet can also develop as an adult ("adult acquired flatfoot") due to injury, illness, unusual or prolonged stress to the foot, faulty biomechanics, or as part of the normal aging process. This is most common in women over 40 years of age. Known risk factors include obesity, hypertension and diabetes. Flat feet can also occur in pregnant women as a result of temporary changes due to increased elastin (elasticity) during pregnancy; if developed by adulthood, flat feet generally remain flat permanently.

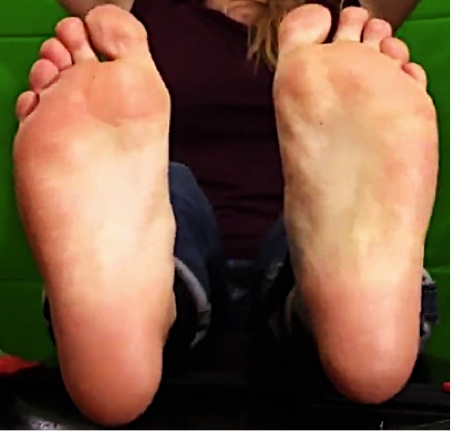
A woman in her thirties dorsiflexes, showing an absence of arches, over-pronated navicular and hallux valgus in the toes typically associated with flat feet.

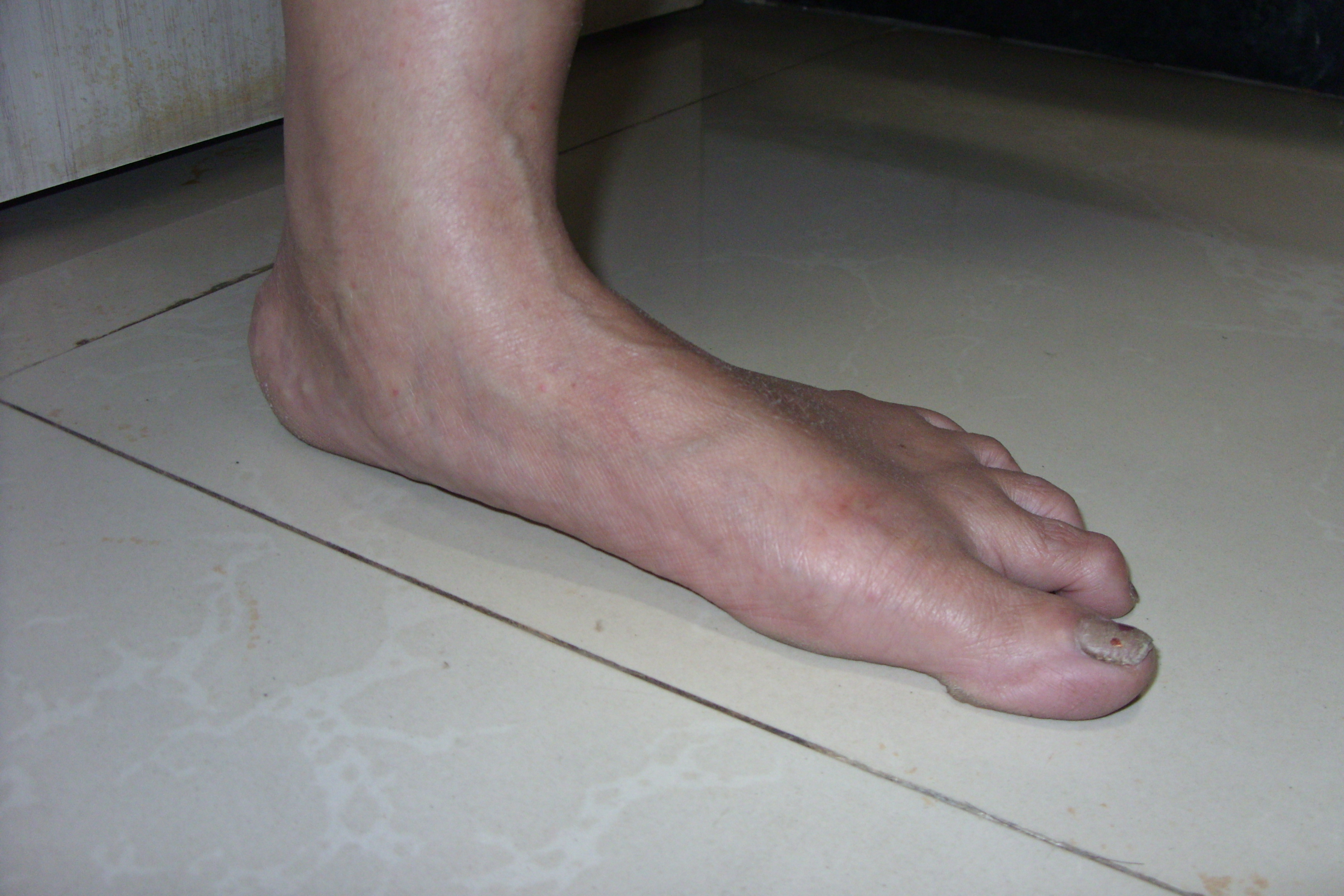
Flatfoot in a 55-year-old female with ankle and knee arthritis

If a youth or adult appears flatfooted while standing in a full weight bearing position, but an arch appears when the person plantarflexes, or pulls the toes back with the rest of the foot flat on the floor, this condition is called flexible flatfoot. This is not a true collapsed arch, as the medial longitudinal arch is still present and the windlass mechanism still operates; this presentation is actually due to excessive pronation of the foot (rolling inwards), although the term 'flat foot' is still applicable as it is a somewhat generic term.

=== Pathophysiology ===
Research has shown that tendon specimens from people who have adult-acquired flat feet show evidence of increased activity of proteolytic enzymes. These enzymes can break down the constituents of the involved tendons and cause the foot arch to fall. In the future, these enzymes may become targets for new drug therapies.

=== Diagnosis ===
Many medical professionals can diagnose a flat foot by examining the patient standing or just looking at them.

An easy and traditional home diagnosis is the "wet footprint" test, performed by wetting the feet in water and then standing on a smooth, level surface such as smooth concrete or thin cardboard or heavy paper. Usually, the more the sole of the foot that makes contact (leaves a footprint), the flatter the foot. In more extreme cases, known as a kinked flatfoot, the entire inner edge of the footprint may actually bulge outward, where in a normal to high arch this part of the sole of the foot does not make contact with the ground at all.

On plain radiography, flat feet can be diagnosed and graded by several measures, the most important in adults being the talonavicular coverage angle, the calcaneal pitch, and the talar-1st metatarsal angle (Meary's angle). The talonavicular coverage angle is abnormally laterally rotated in flat feet. It is normally up to 7 degrees laterally rotated, so a greater rotation indicates flat feet. Radiographies generally need to be taken on weightbearing feet in order to detect misalignment.

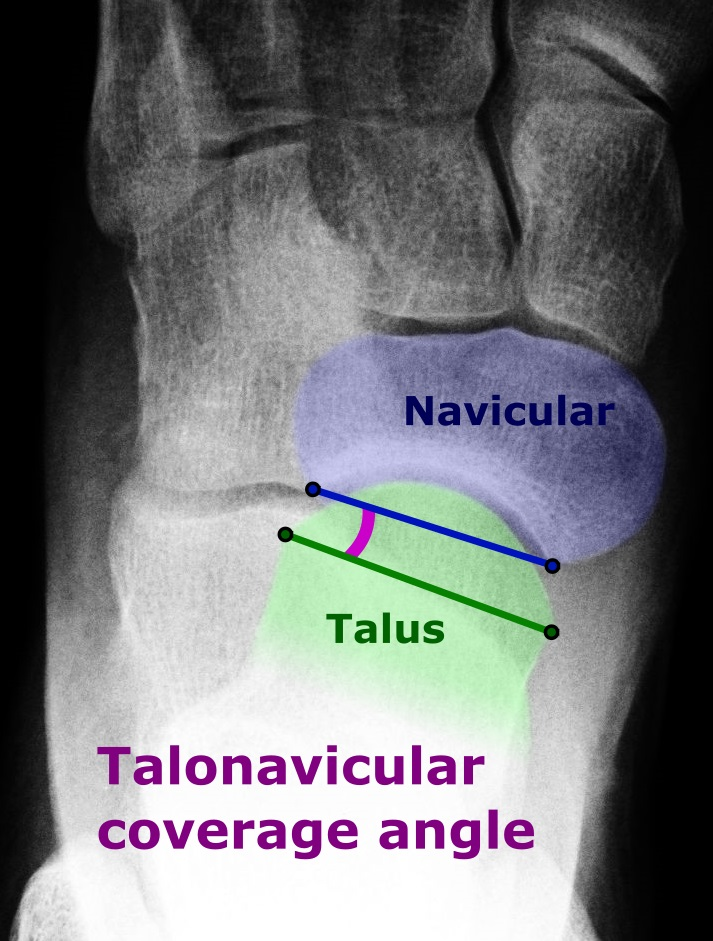
Dorsoplantar projectional radiograph of the foot showing the measurement of the talonavicular coverage angle

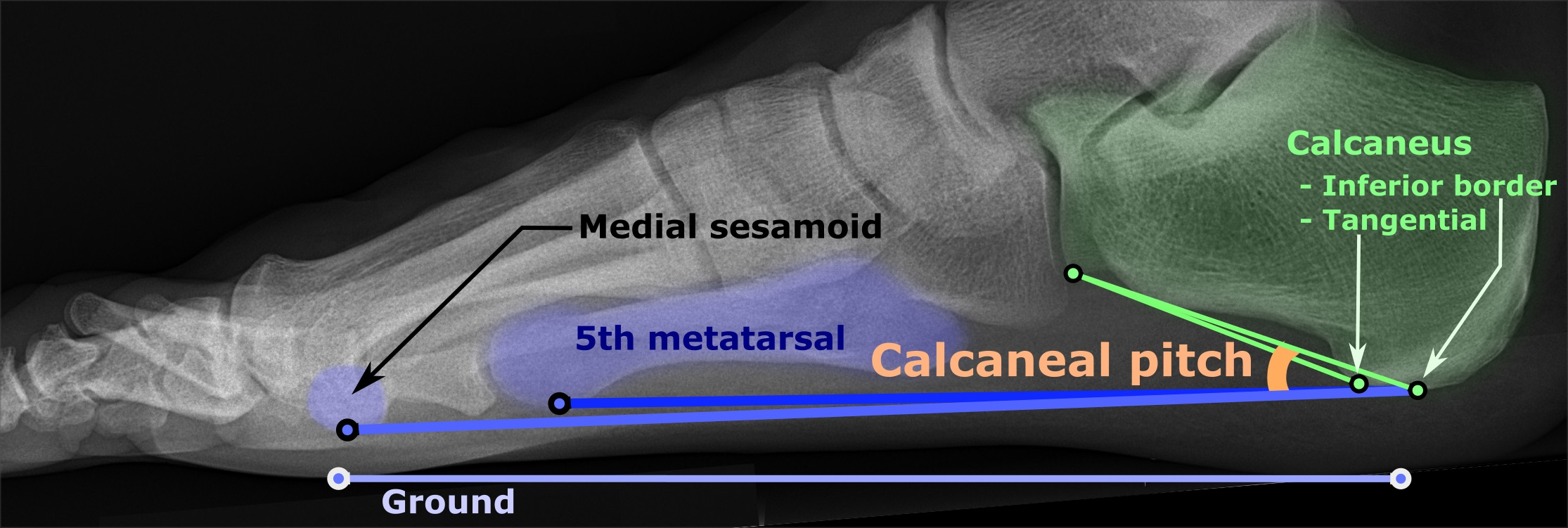
Weight-bearing lateral X-ray showing the measurement of calcaneal pitch, which is an angle of the calcaneus and the inferior aspect of the foot, with different sources giving different reference points. A calcaneal pitch of less than 17° or 18° indicates flat feet.

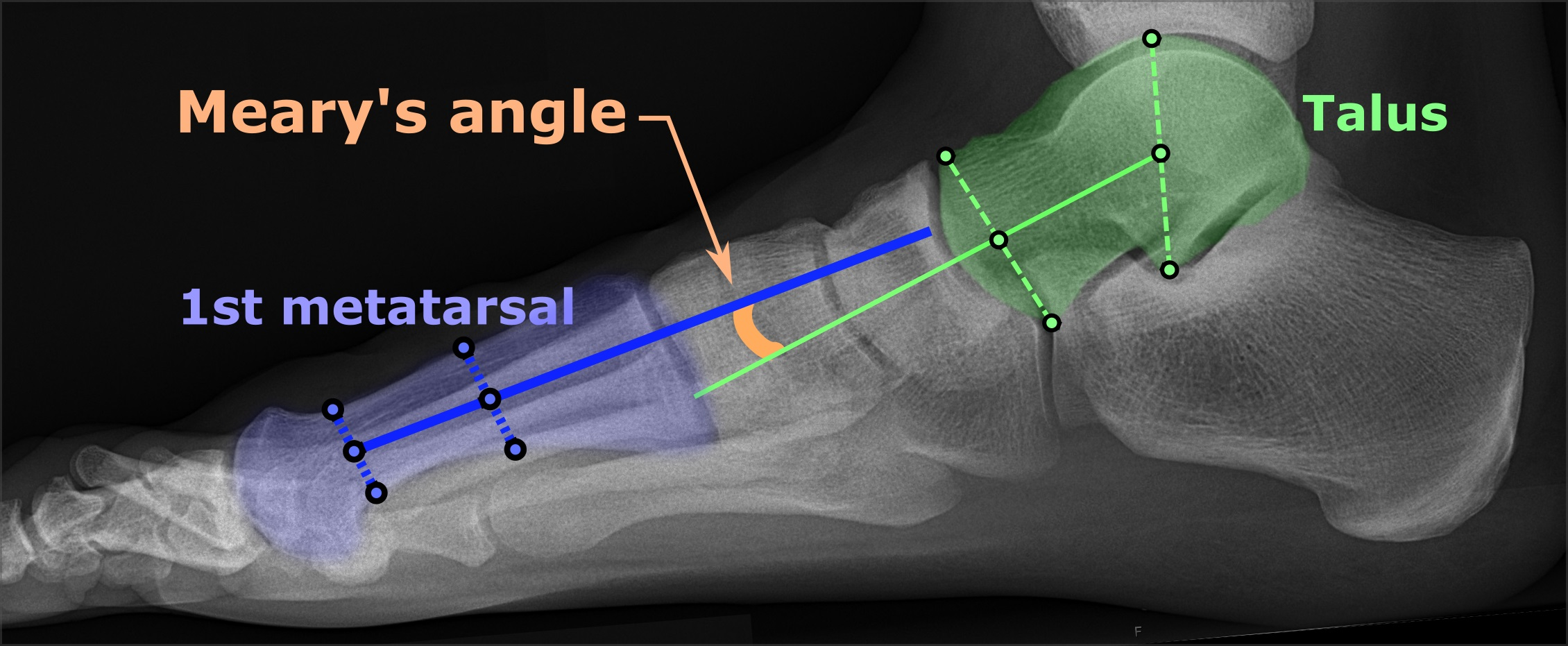
Same lateral X-ray showing the measurement of Meary's angle, which is the angle between the long axis of the talus and first metatarsal bone. An angle greater than 4° convex downward is considered a flat foot, 15° - 30° moderate flat foot, and greater than 30° severe flat foot.

=== Treatment ===
Most flexible flat feet are asymptomatic and do not cause pain. In these cases there is usually no cause for concern. Flat feet were formerly a reason for service rejection in many militaries. However three military studies on asymptomatic adults suggest that persons with asymptomatic flat feet are at least as tolerant of foot stress as the population with various grades of arch.

In a study performed to analyze the activation of the tibialis posterior muscle in adults with pes planus, it was noted that the tendon of this muscle may be dysfunctional and lead to disabling weightbearing symptoms associated with acquired flat foot deformity. The results of the study indicated that, while barefoot, subjects activated additional lower-leg muscles to complete an exercise that resisted foot adduction. However, when the same subjects performed the exercise while wearing arch supporting orthotics and shoes, the tibialis posterior was selectively activated. Such discoveries suggest that the use of shoes with properly fitting arch-supporting orthotics will enhance selective activation of the tibialis posterior muscle, thus acting as an adequate treatment for the undesirable symptoms of pes planus.

Rigid flatfoot, a condition where the sole of the foot is rigidly flat even when a person is not standing, often indicates a significant problem in the bones of the affected feet and can cause pain in about a quarter of those affected. Other flatfoot-related conditions, such as various forms of tarsal coalition (two or more bones in the midfoot or hindfoot abnormally joined) or an accessory navicular (extra bone on the inner side of the foot), should be treated promptly, usually by the very early teen years, before a child's bone structure firms up permanently as a young adult. Both tarsal coalition and an accessory navicular can be confirmed by X-ray. Rheumatoid arthritis can destroy tendons in the foot (or both feet), which can cause this condition, and untreated can result in deformity and early onset of osteoarthritis of the joint. Such a condition can cause severe pain and considerably reduced ability to walk, even with orthoses. Ankle fusion is usually recommended.

Treatment of flat feet may also be appropriate if there is associated foot or lower-leg pain, or if the condition affects the knees or the lower back. Treatment may include foot gymnastics or other exercises as recommended by a podiatrist or physical therapist. In cases of severe flat feet, orthoses should be used through a gradual process to lessen discomfort. Over several weeks, slightly more material is added to the orthosis to raise the arch. These small changes allow the foot structure to adjust gradually, as well as giving the patient time to acclimatize to the sensation of wearing orthoses. In some cases, surgery can provide lasting relief and even create an arch where none existed before; it should be considered a last resort, as it is usually very time-consuming and costly. A minimally invasive surgical intervention involving a small implant is also available. The implant is inserted into the sinus tarsi and prevents the calcaneus and talus from sliding relative to each other. This prevents the sinus tarsi from collapsing and thus prevents the external symptom of the fallen arch from occurring.

== Athletic performance ==
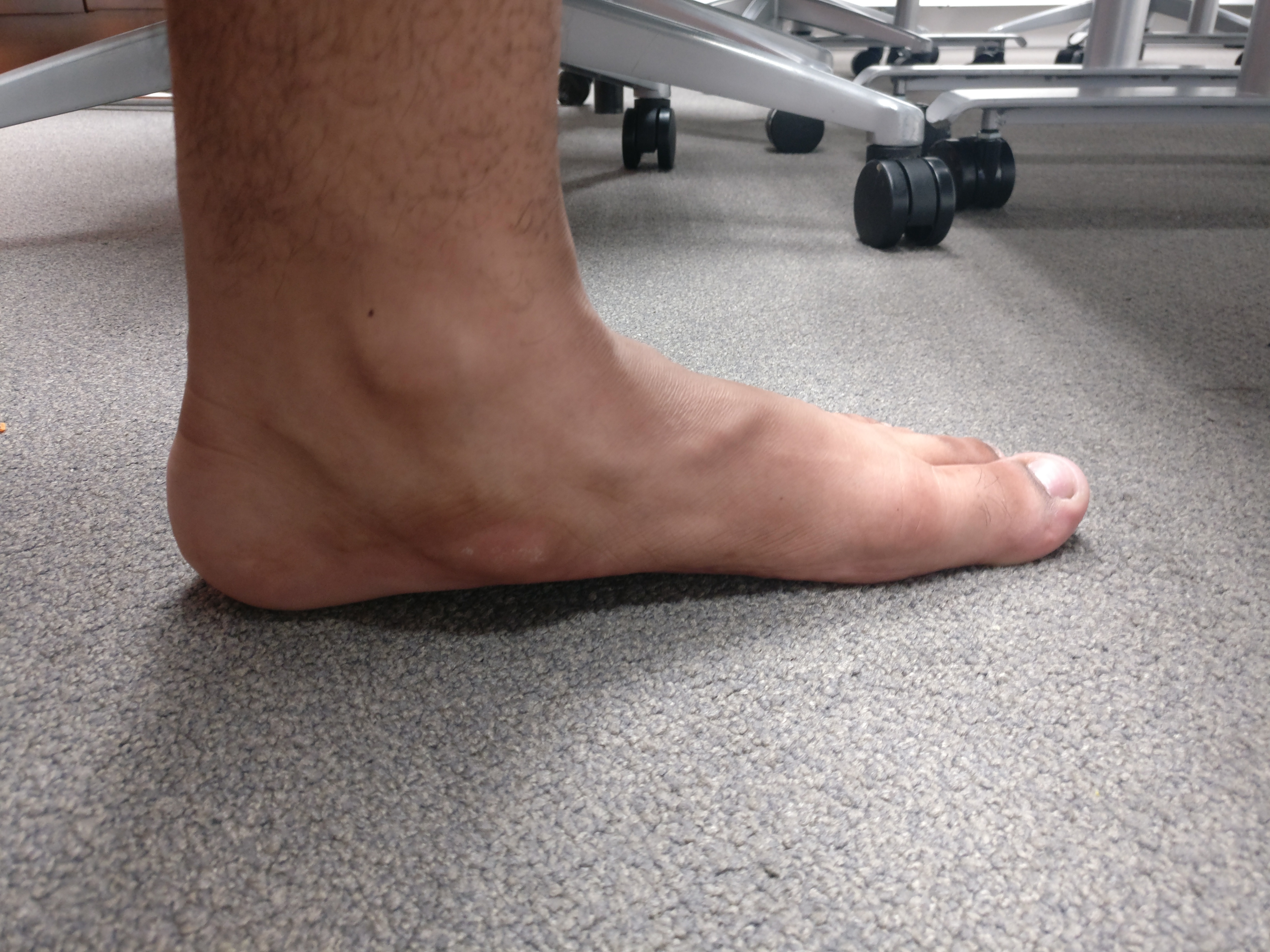
Acquired flat foot deformity with clinical soft tissue swelling.

Individuals with rigid flat feet tend to exhibit symptoms such as foot and knee tendonitis and are recommended to consider surgical options when managing symptoms. Individuals with flexible flat generally exhibit asymptomatic effects in response to their flat feet.

According to AAP news and journal gateway, being flexibly flat-footed does not impede athletic performance in children aged 11–15.

It is generally assumed by running professionals (primarily including some physical trainers, podiatrists, and shoe manufacturers) that a person with flat feet tends to overpronate in the running form. However, some also assert that persons with flat feet may have an underpronating if they are not in a neutral gait. With standard running shoes, these professionals claim, a person who overpronates in his or her running form may be more susceptible to shin splints, back problems, and tendonitis in the knee. Running in shoes with extra medial support or using special shoe inserts, orthoses, may help correct one's running form by reducing pronation and may reduce risk of injury.

== Military performance ==
Studies analyzing the correlation between flat feet and physical injuries in soldiers have been inconclusive, but none suggests that flat feet are an impediment, at least in soldiers who reached the age of military recruitment without prior foot problems.

A 2005 study of Royal Australian Air Force recruits that tracked the recruits over the course of their basic training found that neither flat feet nor high-arched feet had any impact on physical capability, injury rates or bipedal aptitude, although there have been results of military trials that have shown those with flat feet to have fewer injuries.

No current studies have been successful in fully ascertaining the long-term detriments to health caused by the overexertion (necessary for athletes/soldiers performing with flat feet) and other compensating measures commonly enacted by the body during bipedal movement.

Another divergent study of 295 Israel Defense Forces recruits found that those with high arches had almost four times as many stress fractures as those with the lowest arches.

A later study of 449 U.S. Navy special warfare trainees found no significant difference in the incidence of stress fractures among sailors and Marines with different arch heights.

== See also ==
- Planovalgus deformity
- Marfan syndrome
- Ehlers–Danlos syndrome
- Comparison of orthotics
- Rocker-bottom foot
