= Chopart's fracture–dislocation =

- Specialty: Orthopedic

Chopart's fracture–dislocation is a dislocation of the mid-tarsal (talonavicular and calcaneocuboid) joints of the foot, often with associated fractures of the calcaneus, cuboid and navicular.

== Presentation ==
- The foot is usually dislocated medially (80%) and superiorly, which occurs when the foot is plantar flexed and inverted.
- Lateral displacement occurs during eversion injuries.
- Associated fractures of calcaneus, cuboid and navicular are frequent.
- Open fractures occur in a small percentage.

== Mechanism ==
Chopart's fracture–dislocation is usually caused by falls from height, traffic collisions and twisting injuries to the foot as seen in basketball players.

== Diagnosis ==
Diagnosis is made on plain radiograph of the foot, although the extent of injury is often underestimated.

== Treatment ==
Treatment comprises early reduction of the dislocation, and frequently involves open reduction internal fixation to restore and stabilise the talonavicular joint. Open reduction and fusion of the calcaneocuboid joint is occasionally required.

== Prognosis ==
With prompt treatment, particularly open reduction, and early mobilisation the outcome is generally good. High energy injuries and associated fractures worsen the outcome.

== See also ==
- François Chopart
