= Talocalcaneal ligament =

Talocalcaneal ligament may refer to:

- Anterior talocalcaneal ligament (ligamentum talocalcaneum anterius)
- Interosseous talocalcaneal ligament (ligamentum talocalcaneum interosseum)
- Lateral talocalcaneal ligament (ligamentum talocalcaneum laterale)
- Medial talocalcaneal ligament (ligamentum talocalcaneum mediale)
- Posterior talocalcaneal ligament (ligamentum talocalcaneum posterius)
