= Transverse tarsal joint =

Joint in the human foot

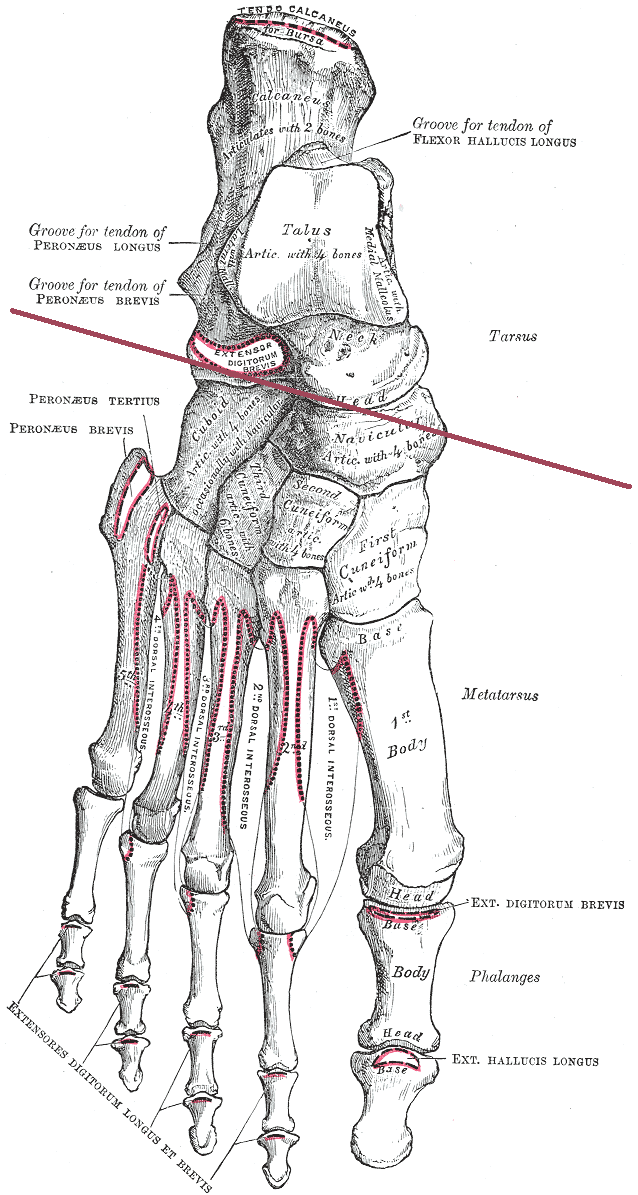
- Line through transverse tarsal joint

Details

Identifiers
- Latin: articulatio tarsi transversa
- TA98: A03.6.10.201
- TA2: 1930
- FMA: 35201

The transverse tarsal joint or midtarsal joint or Chopart's joint is a compound intertarsal synovial joint formed by the articulation of the calcaneus with the cuboid (the calcaneocuboid joint), and the articulation of the talus with the navicular (the talocalcaneonavicular joint).

The movement which takes place in this joint is more extensive than that in the other tarsal joints, and consists of a sort of rotation by means of which the foot may be slightly flexed or extended, the sole being at the same time carried medially (inverted) or laterally (everted).

The term Chopart's joint is named after the French surgeon François Chopart.
