= Bifurcated ligament =

Strong band

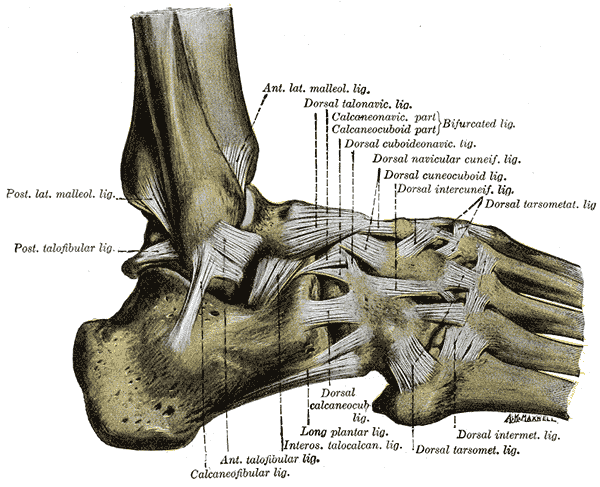
- The ligaments of the foot from the lateral aspect (bifurcated ligament labeled at upper right)

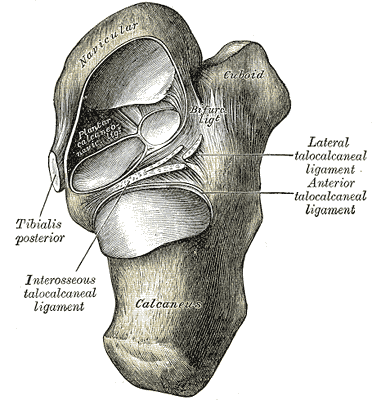
- Talocalcaneal and talocalcaneonavicular articulations exposed from above by removing the talus (bifurcated ligament labeled at upper right)

Details
- From: Calcaneus
- To: cuboid and navicular bone

Identifiers
- Latin: ligamentum bifurcatum
- TA98: A03.6.10.511
- TA2: 1931
- FMA: 44216

The bifurcated ligament (also Chopart ligament, internal calcaneocuboid, interosseous ligament or bifurcate ligament) is a strong band, attached behind to the deep hollow on the upper surface of the calcaneus and dividing in front in a Y-shaped manner into a calcaneocuboid and a calcaneonavicular part.

- The calcaneocuboid ligament (ligamentum calcaneocuboideum) is fixed to the medial side of the cuboid and forms one of the principal bonds between the first and second rows of the tarsal bones.
- The calcaneonavicular ligament (ligamentum calcaneonaviculare) is attached to the lateral side of the navicular. (Note this is NOT the spring ligament which is commonly called the plantar calcaneonavicular ligament).

It is commonly injured in "sprain-type" inversion injuries producing an avulsion fracture at the anterolateral process of the calcaneus.
