= Subtalar joint =

Joint of the foot

- Subtalar Joint

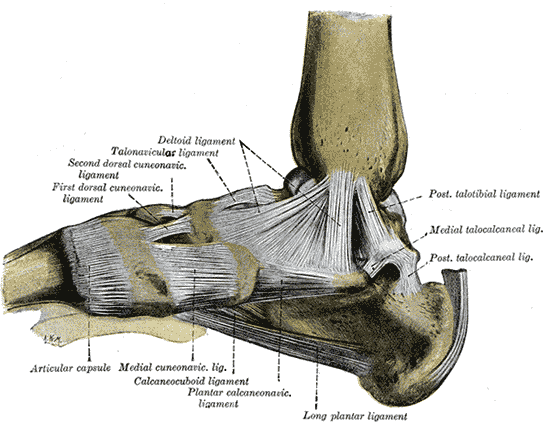
- Ligaments of the medial aspect of the foot.

Details

Identifiers
- Latin: articulatio subtalaris, articulatio talocalcanea
- MeSH: D013380
- TA98: A03.6.10.101
- TA2: 1924
- FMA: 35198

In human anatomy, the subtalar joint, also known as the talocalcaneal joint, is a joint of the foot. It occurs at the meeting point of the talus and the calcaneus.

The joint is classed structurally as a synovial joint, and functionally as a plane joint.

== Structure ==
The talus is oriented slightly obliquely on the anterior surface of the calcaneus.

There are three points of articulation between the two bones: two anteriorly and one posteriorly. The three articulations are known as facets, and they are the posterior, middle and anterior facets.

- At the anterior and middle talocalcaneal articulation, convex areas of the talus fits on to concave surfaces of the calcaneus.
- The posterior talocalcaneal articulation is formed by a concave surface of the talus and a convex surface of the calcaneus.

The sustentaculum tali forms the floor of middle facet, and the anterior facet articulates with the head of the talus, and sits lateral and congruent to the middle facet. The posterior facet is the largest of the three, and separated from the others by the tarsal canal.

=== Ligaments and membranes ===
The main ligament of the joint is the interosseous talocalcaneal ligament, a thick, strong band of two partially joined fibers that bind the talus and calcaneus. It runs through the sinus tarsi, a canal between the articulations of the two bones.

There are four additional ligaments that form weaker connections between the talus and calcaneus.

- The anterior talocalcaneal ligament (or anterior interosseous ligament) attaches at the neck of the talus on the front and lateral surfaces to the superior calcaneus.
- The short band of the posterior talocalcaneal ligament extends from the lateral tubercle of the talus to the upper medial calcaneus.
- The short, strong lateral talocalcaneal ligament connects from the lateral talus under the fibular facet to the lateral calcaneus, and runs parallel to the calcaneofibular ligament.
- The medial talocalcaneal ligament extends from the medial tubercle of the talus to the sustentaculum tali on the medial surface of the calcaneus.

A synovial membrane lines the capsule of the joint, and the joint is wrapped in a capsule of short fibers that are continuous with the talocalcaneonavicular and calcaneocuboid joints of the foot.

== Function ==
The joint allows inversion and eversion of the foot, but plays minimal role in dorsiflexion or plantarflexion of the foot. The centre of rotation of the subtalar joint is thought to be in the region of the middle facet.

It is considered a plane synovial joint, also commonly referred to as a gliding joint. It acts as a hinge connecting the talus and calcaneus. There is extensive variation in the inclination from horizontal.

The subtalar joint can also be considered a combination of the anatomic subtalar joint discussed above, and also the talocalcaneal part of the talocalcaneonavicular joint. This is the more common view of the subtalar joint when discussing its movement. When both of these articulations are accounted together, it allows for pronation and supination of the midfoot to occur.

== Pathology ==
The subtalar joint is particularly susceptible to arthritis, especially when it has previously been affected by sprains or fractures such as those of the calcaneum or talus. Symptoms of subtalar joint arthritis include pain when walking, loss of motion through the joint's range of motion, and difficulty walking on uneven surfaces. Physical therapy, orthotics, and surgery are the main treatment options.

In flat feet, the joint is typically more horizontal.

== Additional images ==
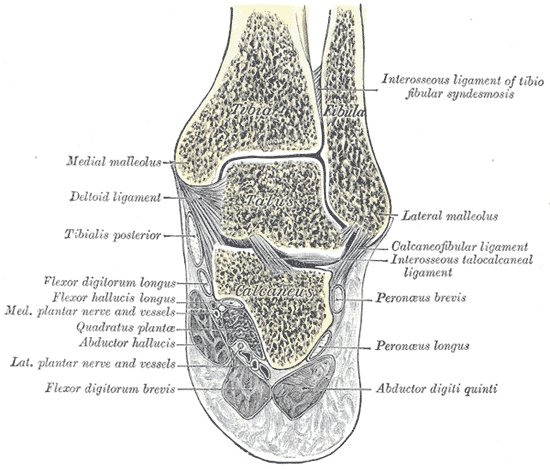
Coronal section through right talocrural and talocalcaneal joints.

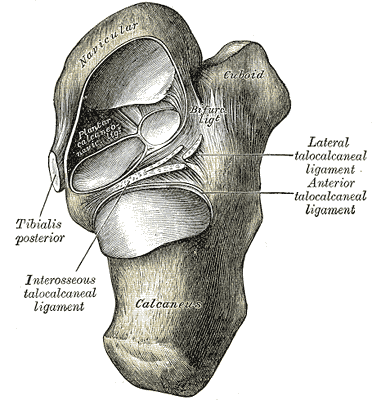
Talocalcaneal and talocalcaneonavicular articulations exposed from above by removing the talus.
