= Anterior talocalcaneal ligament =

Ligament of the foot

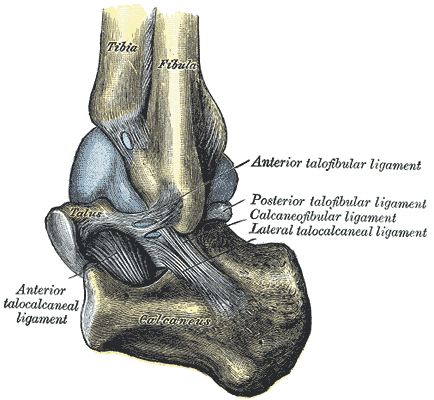
- Capsule of left talocrura articulation (distended). Lateral aspect.

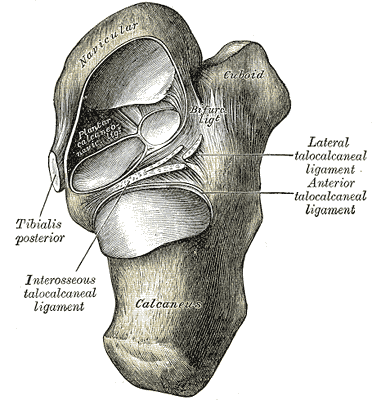
- Subtalar and talocalcaneonavicular articulations exposed from above by removing the talus

Details
- From: Neck of the talus
- To: Superior surface of the calcaneus

Identifiers
- Latin: ligamentum talocalcaneum anterius
- TA2: 1929

The anterior talocalcaneal ligament (anterior calcaneo-astragaloid ligament or anterior interosseous ligament) is a ligament in the foot.

The anterior talocalcaneal ligament extends from the front and lateral surface of the neck of the talus to the sinus tarsi of the calcaneus.

It forms the posterior boundary of the talocalcaneonavicular joint.
