= Dorsal talonavicular ligament =

Ligament of the foot

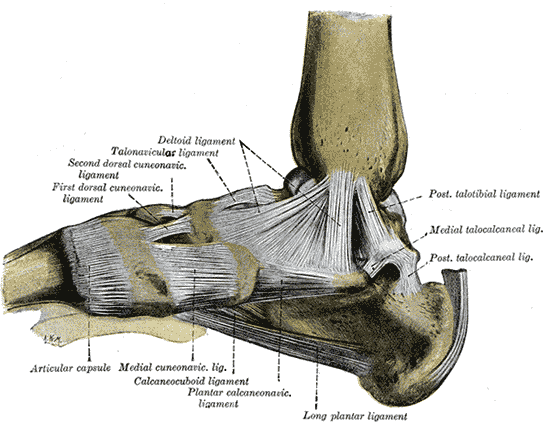
- Ligaments of the medial aspect of the foot. (Talonavicular ligament labeled at center top.)

Details
- From: talus
- To: navicular

Identifiers
- Latin: ligamentum talonaviculare
- TA98: A03.6.10.507
- TA2: 1936
- FMA: 44213

The dorsal talonavicular ligament is a broad, thin band, which connects the neck of the talus to the dorsal surface of the navicular bone; it is covered by the Extensor tendons.

The plantar calcaneonavicular supplies the place of a plantar ligament for this joint.
