= Medial talocalcaneal ligament =

Ligament of the foot

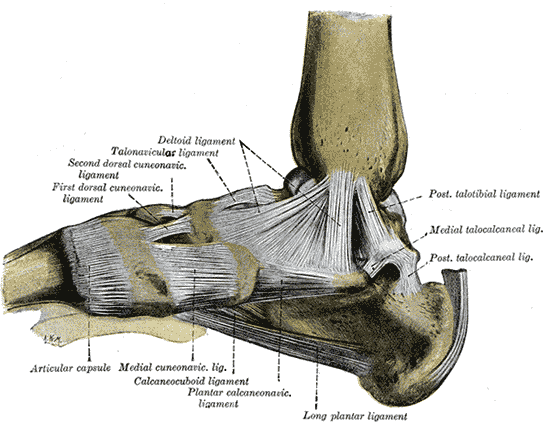
- Ligaments of the medial aspect of the foot.

Details
- From: talus
- To: calcaneus

Identifiers
- Latin: ligamentum talocalcaneum mediale
- TA98: A03.6.10.103
- TA2: 1926
- FMA: 44285

The medial talocalcaneal ligament (internal calcaneo-astragaloid ligament) connects the medial tubercle of the back of the talus with the back of the sustentaculum tali.

Its fibers blend with those of the plantar calcaneonavicular ligament.
