= Lateral talocalcaneal ligament =

Ligament of the ankle

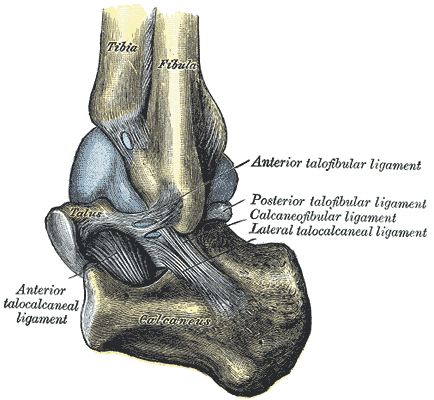
- Capsule of left talocrura articulation (distended). Lateral aspect

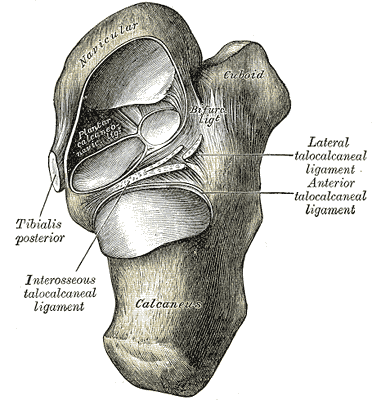
- Talocalcaneal and talocalcaneonavicular articulations exposed from above by removing the talus

Details
- From: talus
- To: Calcaneus

Identifiers
- Latin: ligamentum talocalcaneum laterale
- TA98: A03.6.10.102
- TA2: 1925
- FMA: 44284

The lateral talocalcaneal ligament (external calcaneo-astragaloid ligament) is a ligament in the ankle. It is a short, strong fasciculus, passing from the lateral surface of the talus, immediately beneath its fibular facet to the lateral surface of the calcaneus.

It is placed in front of, but on a deeper plane than, the calcaneofibular ligament, with the fibers of which it is parallel.
