= Calcaneocuboid ligament =

Ligament of the foot

Details
- From: calcaneus
- To: cuboid

Identifiers
- Latin: ligamentum calcaneocuboideum
- TA98: A03.6.10.513
- TA2: 1933
- FMA: 44234

The calcaneocuboid ligament is a fibrous band that connects the superior surface of the calcaneus to the dorsal surface of the cuboid bone.

It forms part of the bifurcated ligament.
