= François Chopart =

French surgeon

- Born: 20 October 1743; Paris
- Died: 9 June 1795 (aged 51); Paris
- Known for: urological surgery
- Scientific career
- Workplaces: École pratique

François Chopart (20 October 1743 – 9 June 1795) was a French surgeon born in Paris.

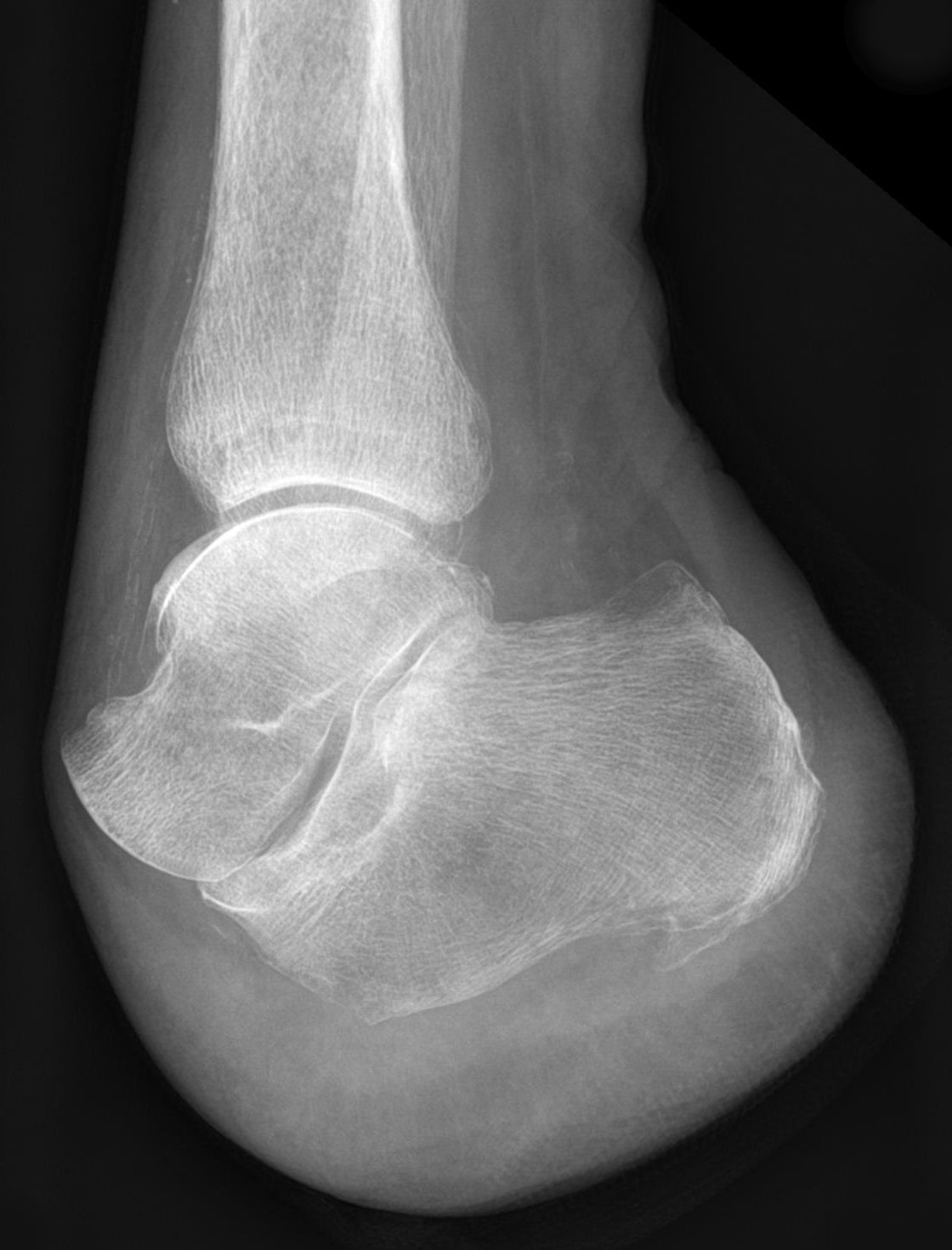
X-ray of a foot after "Chopart's amputation"

He was trained in medicine at the Hôtel-Dieu, Pitié and the Bicêtre hospitals. In 1771 he became a professor of practical surgery at the École pratique in Paris, and in 1782 succeeded Toussaint Bordenave (1728–1782) as chair of physiology.

Chopart was a pioneer of urological surgery, putting emphasis on dealing with the urinary tract as a whole. In 1791/92 he published the two-volume Traité des maladies des voies urinaires.

With Pierre-Joseph Desault (1744–1795), he was author of the surgical treatise Traité des maladies chirurgicales et des opérations qui leur conviennent. There are three eponyms associated with the foot that are named after him:

- "Chopart's amputation": Separation of the forefoot at the midtarsal joint.
- "Chopart's fracture-dislocation": Dislocation of the foot through the talonavicular and calcaneocuboid joints along with associated fractures.
- "Chopart's joint" or the transverse tarsal joint: Articulation between the hindfoot and the midfoot.

In 1795 François Chopart died in Paris during a cholera epidemic.
