= Calcaneocuboid joint =

Joint between the calcaneus bone and the cuboid bone in the foot

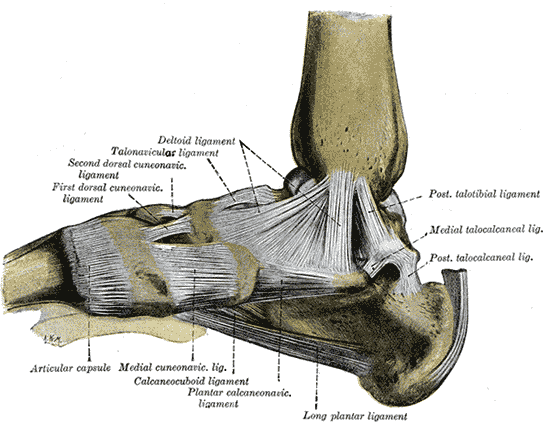
- Ligaments of the medial aspect of the foot. (Calcaneocuboid labeled at bottom center.)

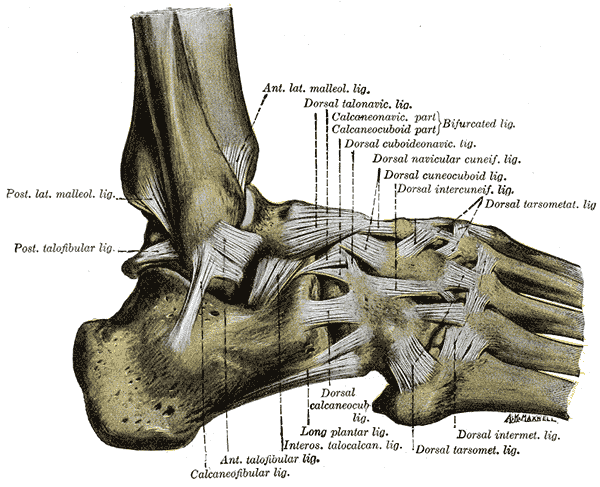
- The ligaments of the foot from the lateral aspect. (Calcaneocuboid labeled at top, third from right.)

Details
- System: skeletal system
- Parts: calcaneus, cuboid bone

Identifiers
- TA98: A03.6.10.204
- TA2: 1938
- FMA: 35207

The calcaneocuboid joint is the joint between the calcaneus and the cuboid bone.

== Structure ==
The calcaneocuboid joint is a type of saddle joint between the calcaneus and the cuboid bone.

=== Ligaments ===
There are five ligaments connecting the calcaneus and the cuboid bone, forming parts of the articular capsule:

- the dorsal calcaneocuboid ligament.
- part of the bifurcated ligament.
- the long plantar ligament.
- and the plantar calcaneocuboid ligament.

== Function ==
The calcaneocuboid joint is conventionally described as among the least mobile joints in the human foot. The articular surfaces of the two bones are relatively flat with some irregular undulations, which seem to suggest movement limited to a single rotation and some translation. However, the cuboid rotates as much as 25° about an oblique axis during inversion-eversion in a movement that could be called involution.

== Clinical significance ==
The calcaneocuboid joint may be affected by a calcaneal fracture. This may be a sign of a worse fracture, associated with worse outcomes (such as osteoarthritis) after treatment.
