= Dorsal calcaneocuboid ligament =

Fasciculus

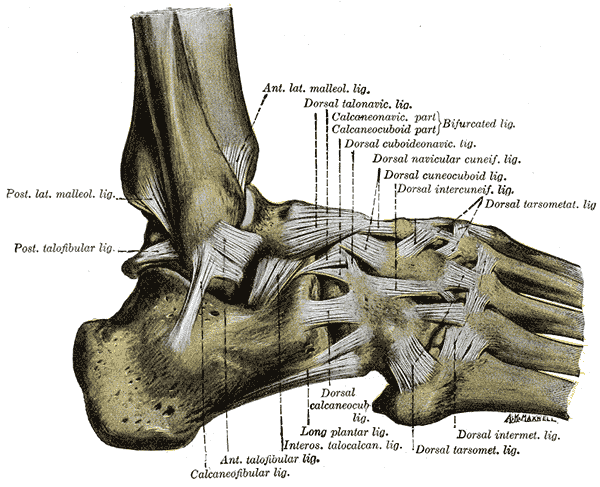
- The ligaments of the foot from the lateral aspect. (Calcaneocuboid labeled at center top.)

Details
- From: calcaneus
- To: cuboid

Identifiers
- Latin: ligamentum calcaneocuboideum dorsale
- TA98: A03.6.10.515
- TA2: 1939
- FMA: 44242

The dorsal calcaneocuboid ligament (superior calcaneocuboid ligament) is a thin but broad fasciculus, which passes between the contiguous surfaces of the calcaneus and cuboid, on the dorsal surface of the joint.
