= Interosseous talocalcaneal ligament =

Ligament of the foot

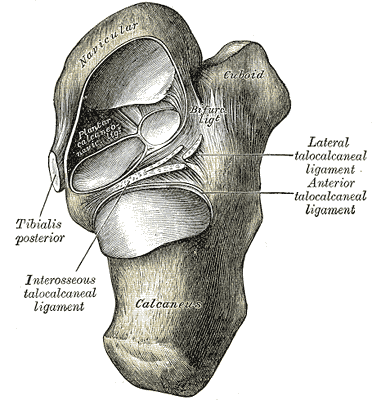
- Talocalcaneal and talocalcaneonavicular articulations exposed from above by removing the talus.

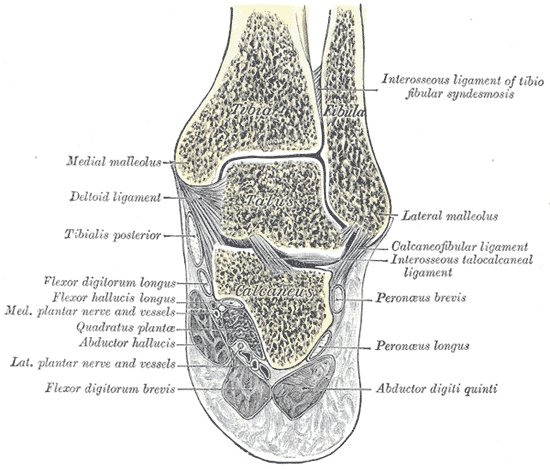
- Coronal section through right talocrural and talocalcaneal joints.

Details
- From: talus
- To: calcaneus

Identifiers
- Latin: ligamentum talocalcaneum interosseum
- TA98: A03.6.10.503
- TA2: 1928
- FMA: 44294 44199, 44294

The interosseous talocalcaneal ligament forms the chief bond of union between the talus and calcaneus.

It is a portion of the united capsules of the talocalcaneonavicular and the talocalcaneal joints, and consists of two partially united layers of fibers, one belonging to the former and the other to the latter joint.

It is attached, above, to the groove between the articular facets of the under surface of the talus; below, to a corresponding depression on the upper surface of the calcaneus.

It is very thick and strong, being at least 2.5 cm. in breadth from side to side, and serves to bind the calcaneus and talus firmly together.

== See also ==
- Subtalar joint
