= Posterior talocalcaneal ligament =

Ligament of the foot

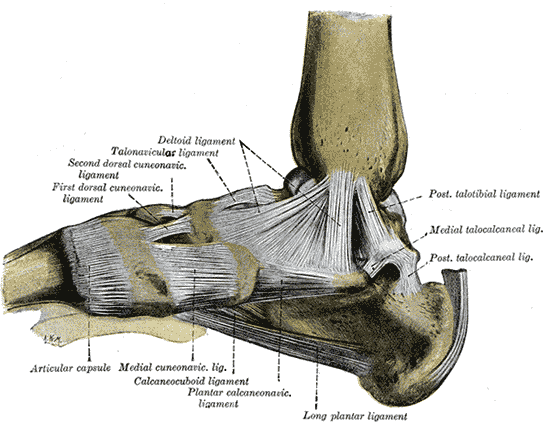
- Ligaments of the medial aspect of the foot.

Details
- From: talus
- To: calcaneus

Identifiers
- Latin: ligamentum talocalcaneum posterius
- TA98: A03.6.10.104
- TA2: 1927
- FMA: 44291

The posterior talocalcaneal ligament (posterior calcaneo-astragaloid ligament) connects the lateral tubercle of the talus with the upper and medial part of the calcaneus; it is a short band, and its fibers radiate from their narrow attachment to the talus.
