= Calcaneal fracture =

- Other names: Heel bone fracture, lover's fracture, Don Juan fracture
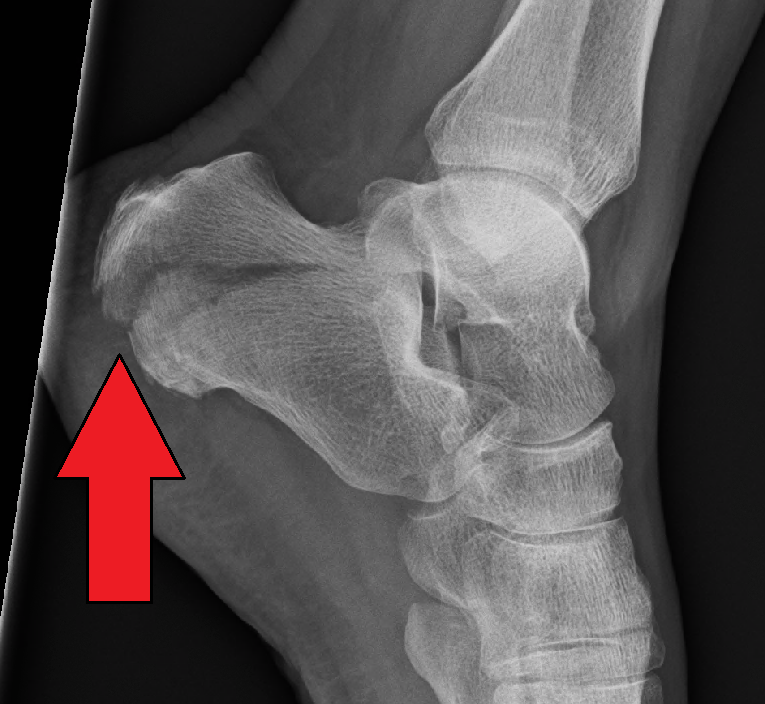
- X-ray of a fractured calcaneus
- Specialty: Orthopedics, emergency medicine
- Symptoms: Pain, bruising, trouble walking, deformity of the heel
- Complications: Arthritis, decreased range of motion of the foot
- Causes: Landing on the feet following a fall from a height, motor vehicle collision
- Diagnostic method: Based on symptoms, X-rays, CT scan
- Treatment: Casting, surgery
- Medication: NSAIDs, opioids
- Prognosis: 3 month to 2 year recovery
- Frequency: ~2% of fractures

A calcaneal fracture is a break of the calcaneus (heel bone). Symptoms may include pain, bruising, trouble walking, and deformity of the heel. It may be associated with breaks of the hip or back.

It usually occurs when a person lands on their feet following a fall from a height or during a motor vehicle collision. Diagnosis is suspected based on symptoms and confirmed by X-rays or CT scanning.

If the bones remain normally aligned treatment may be by casting without weight bearing for around eight weeks. If the bones are not properly aligned surgery is generally required. Returning the bones to their normal position results in better outcomes. Surgery may be delayed a few days as long as the skin remained intact.

About 2% of all fractures are calcaneal fractures. However, they make up 60% of fractures of the mid foot bones. Undisplaced fractures may heal in around three months while more significant fractures can take two years. Difficulties such as arthritis and decreased range of motion of the foot may remain.

== Signs and symptoms ==
The most common symptom is pain over the heel area, especially when the heel is palpated or squeezed. Patients usually have a history of recent trauma to the area or fall from a height. Other symptoms include: inability to bear weight over the involved foot, limited mobility of the foot, and limping. Upon inspection, the examiner may notice swelling, redness, and hematomas. A hematoma extending to the sole of the foot is called "Mondor Sign", and is pathognomonic for calcaneal fracture. The heel may also become widened with associated edema due to displacement of lateral calcaneal border. Soft tissue involvement should be evaluated because of the association with serious complications (see below).

=== Complications ===
Evaluating soft-tissue involvement is the most important aspect of the clinical examination because of its association with patient outcome. Skin blisters may become infected if medical attention is delayed, which can lead to necrotizing fasciitis or osteomyelitis, causing permanent damage to muscle or bone. Ligament and tendon involvement should also be explored. Achilles tendon injury can be seen with posterior (Type C) fractures. Since calcaneal fractures are related to falls from height, other concomitant injuries should be evaluated. Vertebral compression fractures occur in approximately 10% of these patients. A trauma-focused clinical approach should be implemented; tibial, knee, femur, hip, and head injuries should be ruled out by means of history and physical exam.

== Cause ==
Calcaneal fractures are often attributed to shearing stress adjoined with compressive forces combined with a rotary direction (Soeur, 1975). These forces are typically linked to injuries in which an individual falls from a height, involvement in an automobile accident, or muscular stress where the resulting forces can lead to the trauma of fracture. Overlooked aspects of what can lead to a calcaneal fracture are the roles of osteoporosis and diabetes.

Unfortunately, the prevention of falls and automobile accidents is limited and applies to unique circumstances that should be avoided. The risk of muscular stress fractures can be reduced through stretching and weight-bearing exercise, such as strength training. In addition, footwear can influence forces that may cause a calcaneal fracture and can prevent them as well. A 2012 study conducted by Salzler showed that the increasing trend toward minimalist footwear or running barefoot can lead to a variety of stress fractures including that of the calcaneus.

=== Osteoporosis ===
Bone mineral density decreases with increasing age. Osteoporotic bone loss can be prevented through an adequate intake of vitamin C and vitamin D, coupled with exercise and by being a non-smoker. A study by Cheng et al. in 1997, showed that greater bone density indicated less risk for fractures in the calcaneus.

=== Diabetes ===
In 1991, Kathol conducted a study which showed a correlation between calcaneal insufficiency avulsion fractures (a fracture in which the Achilles tendon removes a portion of the bone as it rescinds) and diabetes mellitus. The diabetic population is more susceptible to the risks of fracture and potential healing complications and infection that may lead to limb amputation. Diabetes can be regulated and prevented through diet and exercise.

== Diagnosis ==
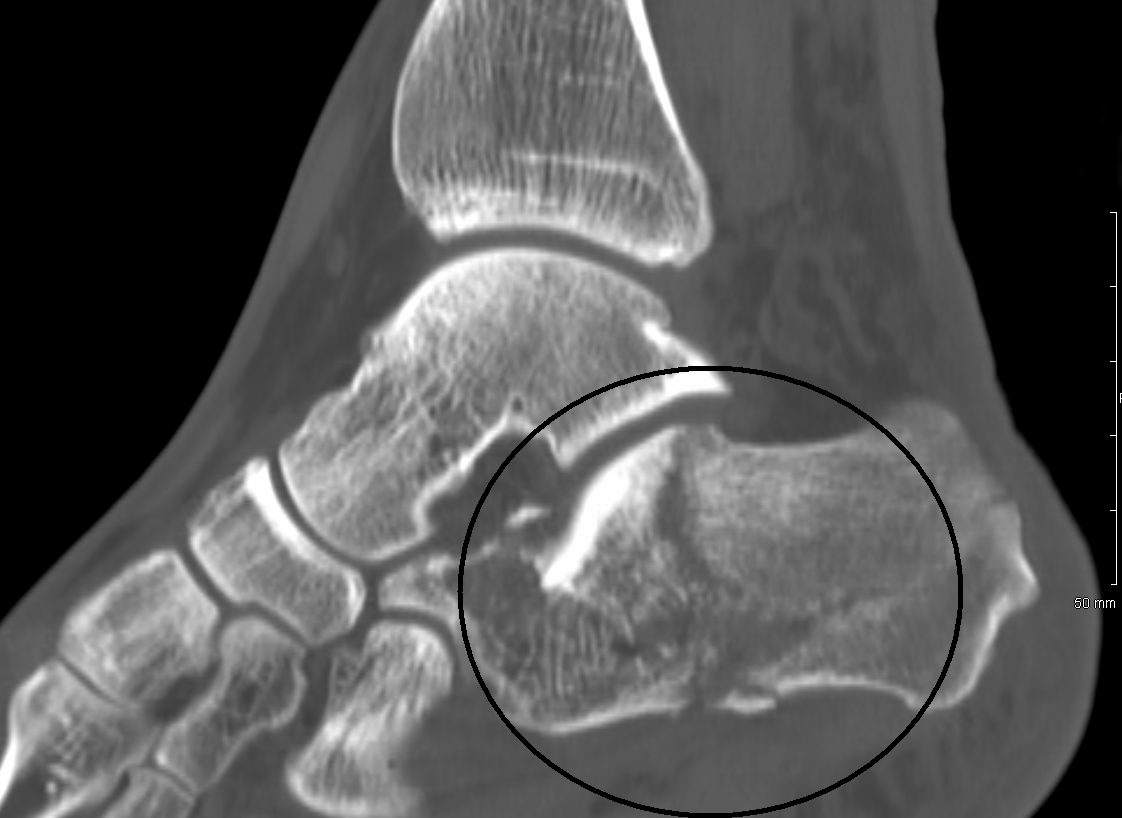
A fractured calcaneus as seen on CT

Conventional radiography is usually the initial assessment tool when a calcaneal fracture is suspected. Recommended x-ray views are (a) axial, (b) anteroposterior, (c) oblique and (d) views with dorsiflexion and internal rotation of the foot. However, conventional radiography is limited for visualization of calcaneal anatomy, especially at the subtalar joint. A CT scan is currently the imaging study of choice for evaluating calcaneal injury and has substituted conventional radiography in the classification of calcaneal fractures. Axial and coronal views are obtained for proper visualization of the calcaneus, subtalar, calcaneocuboid and talonavicular joints.

=== Classification ===
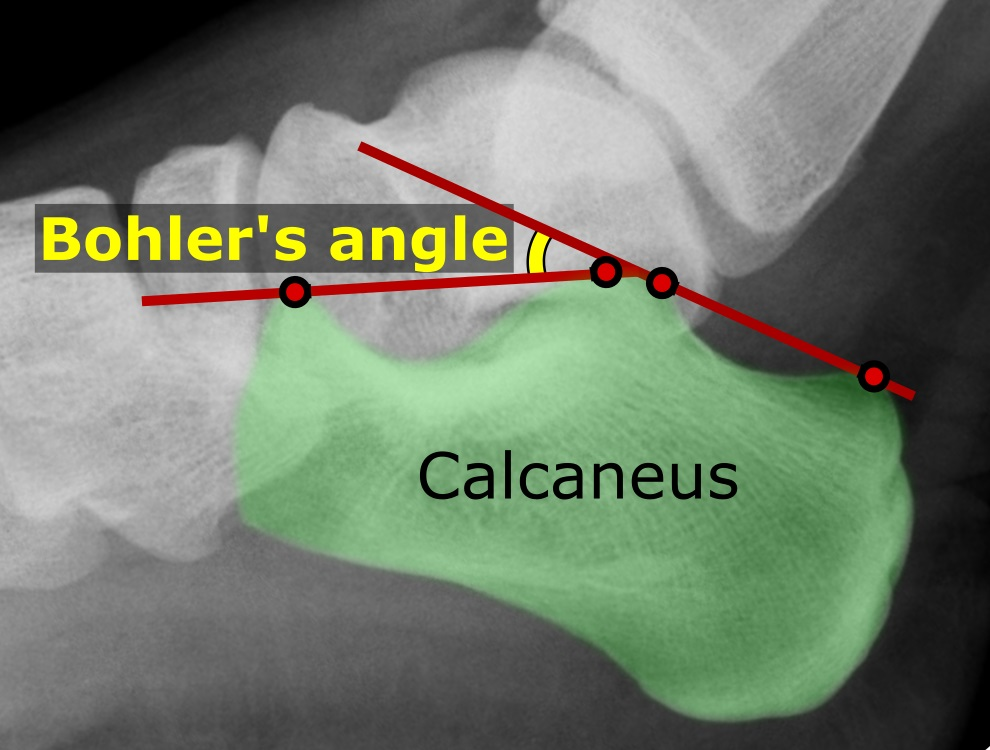
Bohler's angle

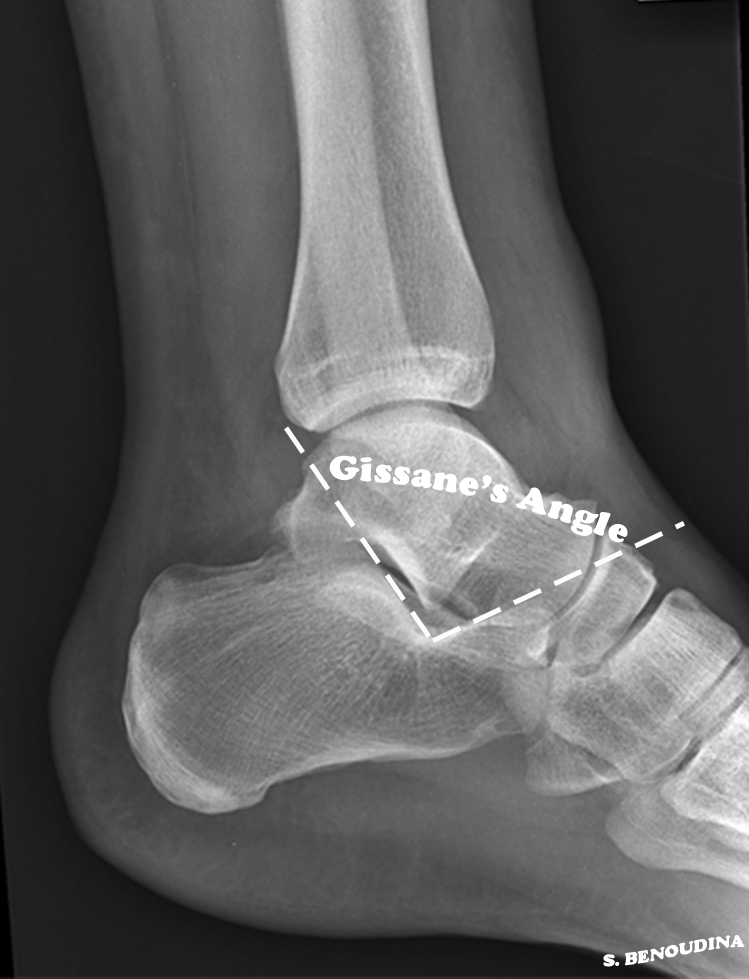
Gissane's angle

The calcaneus, also known as the heel bone, is the largest of the tarsal bones and articulates with the cuboid bone anteriorly and the talus bone superiorly. It is responsible for transmitting the majority of the body's weight from the talus bone to the ground.

Calcaneal fractures are categorized as intra-articular or extra-articular on the basis of subtalar joint involvement. Intra-articular fractures are more common and involve the posterior talar articular facet of the calcaneus. The Sanders classification groups these fractures into four types based on the location of the fracture at the posterior articular surface. Extra-articular fractures are less common and may be located anywhere outside the subtalar joint. Extra-articular fractures are categorized depending on whether the involvement of the calcaneus is anterior (Type A), middle (Type B) or posterior (Type C).

The Angle of Gissane, or "Critical Angle", is the angle formed by the downward and upward slopes of the calcaneal superior surface. On a lateral radiograph, an angle of Gissane > 130° suggests fracture of the posterior subtalar joint surface. Böhler's angle, or the "Tuber Angle", is another normal anatomic landmark seen in lateral radiographs. It is formed by the intersection of 1) a line from the highest point of the posterior articular facet to the highest point of the posterior tuberosity, and 2) a line from the former to the highest point on the anterior articular facet. Böhler's angle is normally 25° to 40°. It is named after Austrian physician Lorenz Böhler. A decreased angle is indicative of a calcaneal fracture.

The Sanders classification system is the most commonly used system for categorizing intra-articular fractures. There are 4 types:

1. Type I fractures are non-displaced fractures (displacement < 2 mm).
2. Type II fractures consist of a single intra-articular fracture that divides the calcaneus into 2 pieces.
  - Type IIA: fracture occurs on lateral aspect of calcaneus.
  - Type IIB: fracture occurs on central aspect of calcaneus.
  - Type IIC: fracture occurs on medial aspect of calcaneus.
3. Type III fractures consist of two intra-articular fractures that divide the calcaneus into 3 articular pieces.
  - Type IIIAB: two fracture lines are present, one lateral and one central.
  - Type IIIAC: two fracture lines are present, one lateral and one medial.
  - Type IIIBC: two fracture lines are present, one central and one medial.
4. Type IV fractures consist of fractures with more than three intra-articular fractures.

Extra-articular fractures include all fractures that do not involve the posterior facet of the subtalar joint.

- Type A involve the anterior calcaneus
- Type B involve the middle calcaneus. This includes the sustentaculum tali, trochlear process and lateral process.
- Type C involve the posterior calcaneus, the posterior tuberosity and medial tubercle included.

== Treatment ==
Non-surgical treatment is for extra-articular fractures and Sanders Type I intra-articular fractures, provided that the calcaneal weight-bearing surface and foot function are not compromised. Physicians may choose to perform closed reduction with or without fixation (casting), or fixation alone (without reduction), depending on the individual case. Recommendations include no weight-bearing for a few weeks followed by range-of-motion exercises and progressive weight bearing for a period of 2–3 months.

Displaced intra-articular fractures require surgical intervention within 3 weeks of fracture, before bone consolidation has occurred. Conservative surgery consists of closed reduction with percutaneous fixation. This technique is associated with less wound complications, better soft tissue healing (because of less soft tissue manipulation) and decreased intraoperative time. However, this procedure has increased risk of inadequate calcaneal bone fixation, compared to open procedures. Currently, open reduction with internal fixation (ORIF) is usually the preferred surgical approach when dealing with displaced intra-articular fractures. Newer, more innovative surgical techniques and equipment have decreased the incidence of intra- and post-operative complications. An updated (2023) systematic review found with limited confidence that surgery may lead to improved functional outcomes but at the risk of unplanned second surgeries. With the growing prevalence of minimally invasive surgeries further studies are needed to better determine if these newer surgical interventions offer improved outcomes.

=== Rehabilitation ===
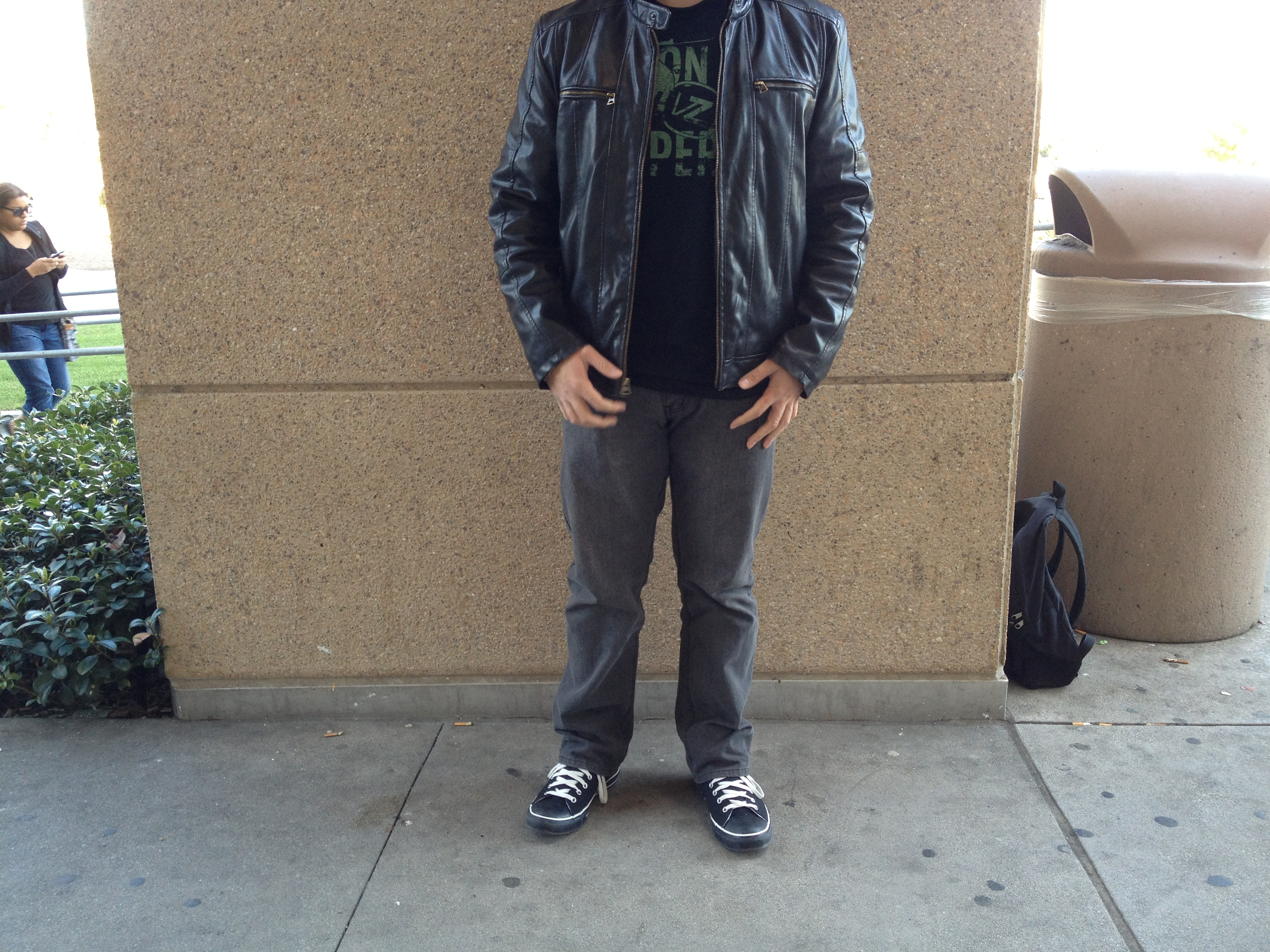
Calcaneal fracture neutral position

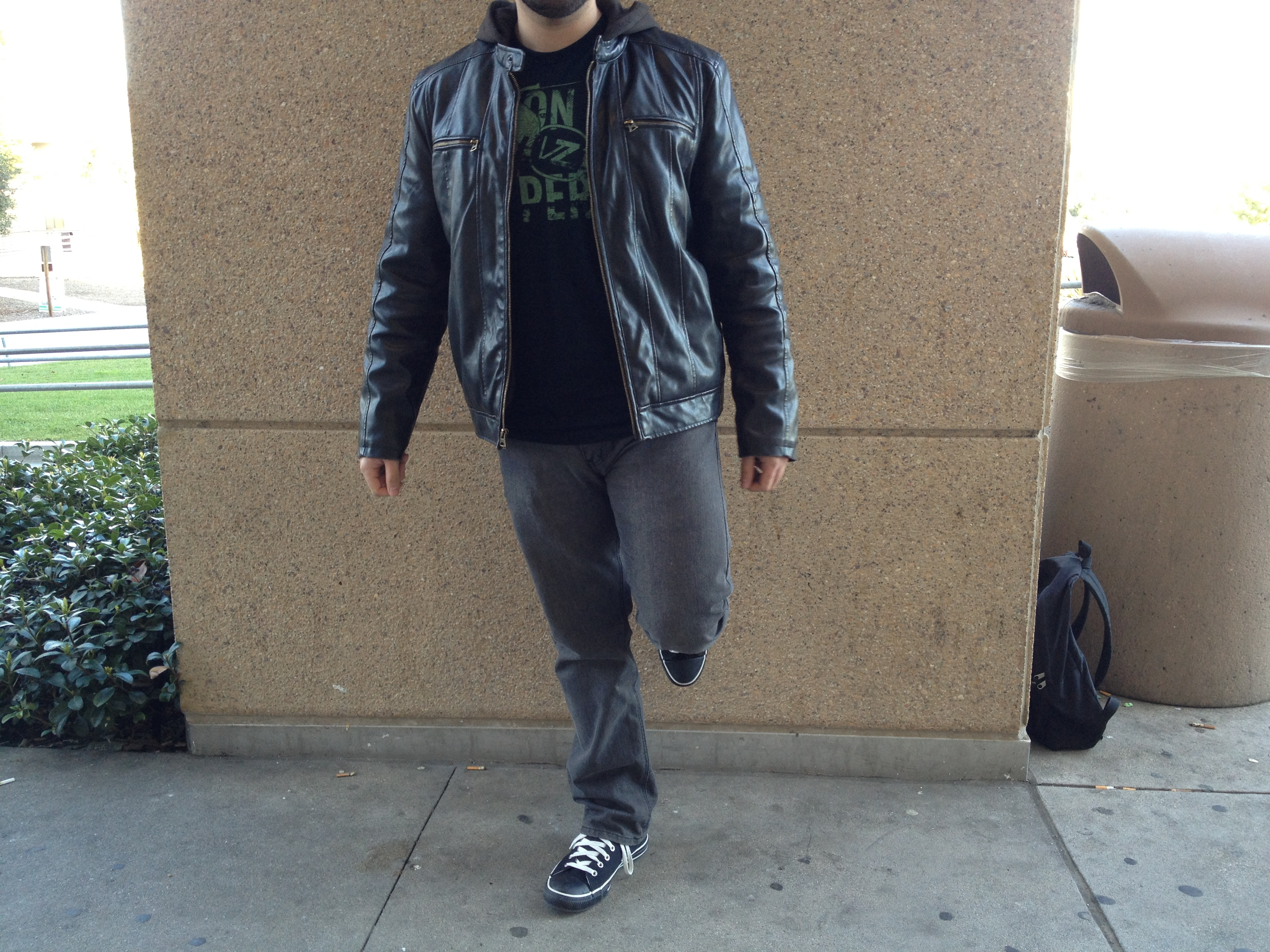
Leg Stand

Rehabilitation for a calcaneal fractures is dependent on whether surgery was required or not. Both types of rehabilitation require three phases in which only the first phase is different.

Exercises that can be used for the range of motion phase can include eversion and inversion of the ankle, flexion and extension of the ankle, and a combination of the two motions to create a circular foot motion. Exercises that allow slight to full body weight to be used in the final phases include stepping forward then back, side-stepping, and leg stand.

=== Phases ===
The first phase of the rehabilitation after surgery includes keeping the foot elevated and iced for the first 2 days after the operation. After those 2 days, using crutches or a wheelchair in which there is no weight applied to the affected foot is recommended to getting around. If no operation was performed, the foot should be submitted to frequent range of motion exercises. The second phase occurs 6 weeks after and consists of keeping the foot elevated and iced while resting and performing exercises in which only slight weight is applied to the affected area for the next two weeks, others recommend six weeks of this phase. In this phase, range of motion exercises should be implemented if surgery was needed for the fracture. The third and final phase of rehabilitation of calcaneal fractures is to allow the full body weight to be used and use crutches or a cane if needed, between 13 weeks to a year the patient is allowed to resume normal activities.

== Society and culture ==
The name lover's fracture is derived from the fact that a lover may jump from great heights while trying to escape from the lover's spouse.

== Bibliography ==
- Brant W, Helms C (2007). Fundamentals of Diagnostic Radiology (3rd ed.). Lippincott Williams & Wilkins. ISBN 978-0-7817-6135-2.
