= Sanders classification =

Orthopedic classification system

In orthopedic medicine, the Sanders classification is a system of categorizing intra-articular calcaneal fractures based on the number of articular fragments seen on the coronal CT image at the widest point of the posterior facet.

== Classification ==
Type	Description
I	Nondisplaced posterior facet
II	Displaced with one fracture line in the posterior facet
III	Displaced with two fracture lines in the posterior facet
IV	Comminuted with more than three fracture lines in the posterior facet

== See also ==
- Foot fracture
