= Plantar calcaneonavicular ligament =

Ligaments on the underside of the foot

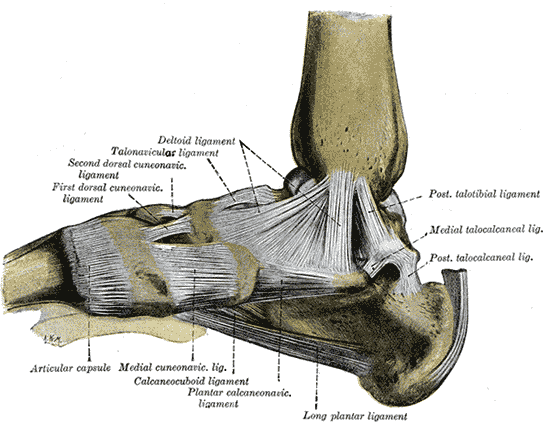
- Ligaments of the medial aspect of the foot. (Plantar calcaneonavicular ligament labeled at bottom center.)

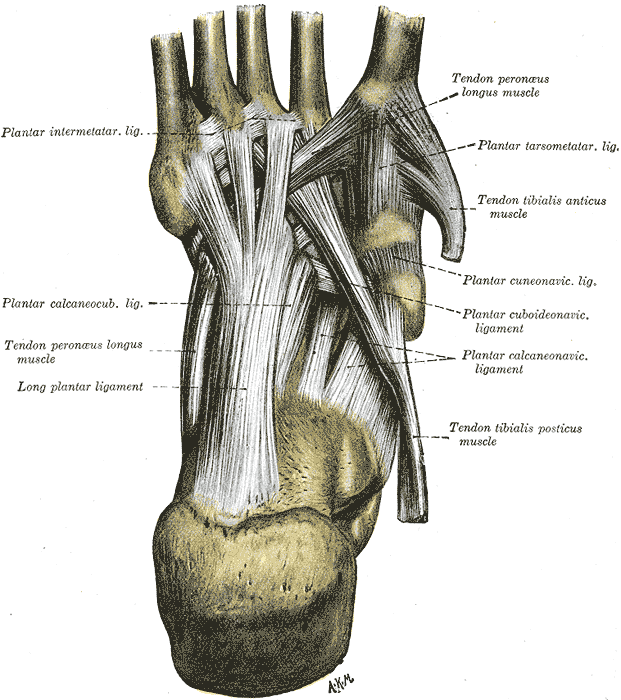
- Ligaments of the sole of the foot, with the tendons of the peronæus longus, tibialis posterior and tibialis anterior muscles. (Plantar calcaneonavicular ligament labeled at right, second from the bottom.)

Details
- From: calcaneus
- To: navicular

Identifiers
- Latin: ligamentum calcaneonaviculare plantare
- TA98: A03.6.10.203
- TA2: 1937
- FMA: 44254

The plantar calcaneonavicular ligament (also known as the spring ligament or spring ligament complex) is a complex of three ligaments on the underside of the foot that connect the calcaneus with the navicular bone.

== Structure ==
The plantar calcaneonavicular ligamentous complex is a broad and thick band with three constituent ligaments. These connect the anterior margin of the sustentaculum tali of the calcaneus to the plantar surface of the navicular bone. Its individual components are the:

- superomedial calcaneonavicular ligament.
- medioplantar oblique ligament.
- inferior calcaneonavicular ligament.

These ligament components attach to different parts of the navicular bone.

The dorsal or superomedial component of the ligament presents a fibrocartilaginous facet, lined by the synovial membrane, upon which a portion of the head of the talus rests. Its plantar surface, consisting of the intermedial and lateral ligaments, is supported by the tendon of the tibialis posterior; its medial border is blended with the forepart of the deltoid ligament of the ankle-joint.

== Function ==
This ligamentous complex not only serves to connect the calcaneus and navicular bone, but supports the head of the talus, forming part of the articular cavity in which it is received. It helps to maintain the medial longitudinal arch of the foot. By providing support to the head of the talus, it bears most of the body weight in a normally functioning foot.

== Clinical significance ==
A sprain to the plantar calcaneonavicular ligament can result in flatfoot deformity, which can impair mobility.

== See also ==
- Long plantar ligament
- Short plantar ligament
