= Talocalcaneonavicular joint =

Joint in the foot

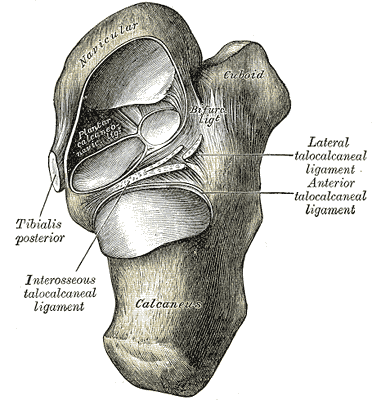
- Talocalcaneal and talocalcaneonavicular joints exposed from above by removing the talus.

Details

Identifiers
- Latin: articulatio talocalcaneonavicularis
- TA98: A03.6.10.202
- TA2: 1935
- FMA: 35204

The talocalcaneonavicular joint is a ball and socket joint in the foot; the rounded head of the talus is received into the concavity formed by the posterior surface of the navicular, the anterior articular surface of the calcaneus, and the upper surface of the plantar calcaneonavicular ligament.

== Structure ==
As its shape suggests, this joint is a synovial ball-and-socket joint. It is composed of three articular surfaces:

- The articulation between the medial talar articular surface on the sustentaculum tali of the superior calcaneus and the corresponding medial facet found inferiorly on the talus neck
- The articulation between the anterior talar articular surface of the superior calcaneus and the anterior facet of the corresponding talus found inferiorly on the talar head
- The articulation between the articular surface of navicular and the head of talus (talonavicular joint)

== Ligaments ==
The plantar calcaneonavicular ligament also called the spring ligament forms the whole floor of the talus as it extends inferior to the talus. It attaches to the anterior aspect of sustentaculum tali inserting into the plantar surface of navicular. By beginning from sustentaculum tali it covers the plantar surfaces of the middle and anterior articulations between the calcaneus and talus and by attaching to the navicular it covers the articulation between the talus and navicular. That is a reason why the medial longitudinal arch of the foot is a bit higher than the lateral longitudinal arch of the foot as this ligament is a main part of it.

The calcaneonavicular part of the bifurcated ligament extends from the dorsolateral side of calcaneus (near the tarsal sinus) to the lateral side of the navicular. It reinforces the joint particularly laterally where the talus articulates with the navicular.

The dorsal talonavicular ligament extends from the dorsal aspect of the foot from the neck of the talus to the navicular.

The socket of this joint is formed by the concave articular facets of the navicular, calcaneus, calcaneonavicular part of bifurcate ligament and the spring ligament (plantar calcaneonavicular ligament), where the ball is formed by the convex talus.
