= Navicular bone =

Small bone found in the feet of most mammals

Details

Identifiers
- Latin: os naviculare
- TA98: A02.5.12.001
- TA2: 1484
- FMA: 24499

The navicular bone /nəˈvɪkjʊlər/ is a small bone found in the feet of most mammals.

== Human anatomy ==
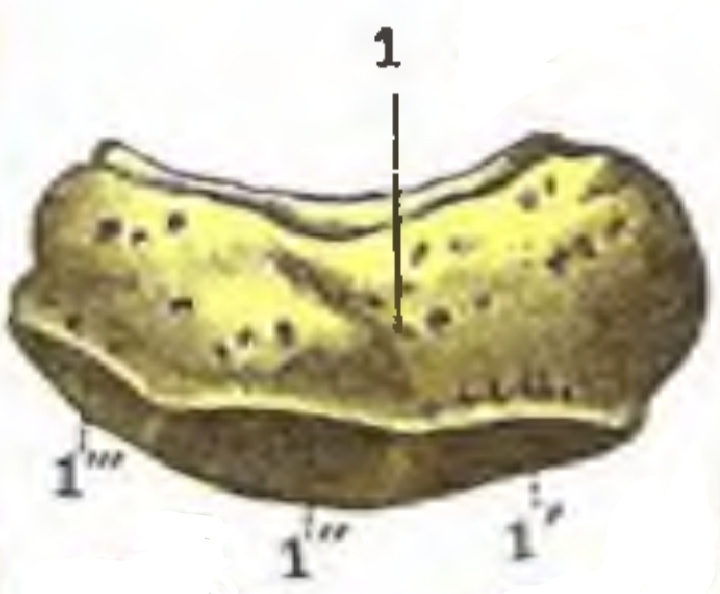
Navicular of the right foot; superior (dorsal) view. (After Testut's Anatomy.)

The navicular bone in humans is one of the tarsal bones, found in the foot. Its name derives from the human bone's resemblance to a small boat, caused by the strongly concave proximal (i.e., posterior) articular surface. The term navicular bone or hand navicular bone was historically used for the scaphoid bone, one of the carpal bones of the wrist.

The navicular bone in humans is located on the medial side of the foot, and articulates proximally with the talus, distally with the three cuneiform bones, and laterally with the cuboid.

It is the last of the foot bones to start ossification and does not tend to do so until the beginning of the fourth year in typical anatomy, although a large range of variation has been reported.

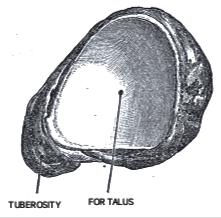
Navicular of the right foot. Posterior view. (From Gray's Anatomy.)

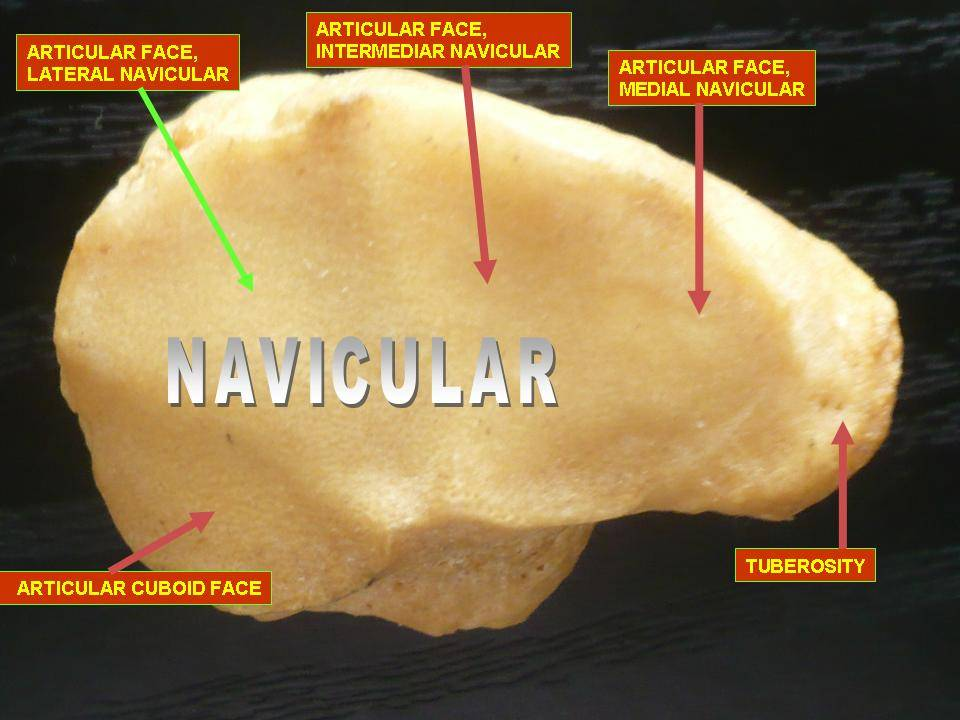
Navicular bone of the right foot. Anterior view.

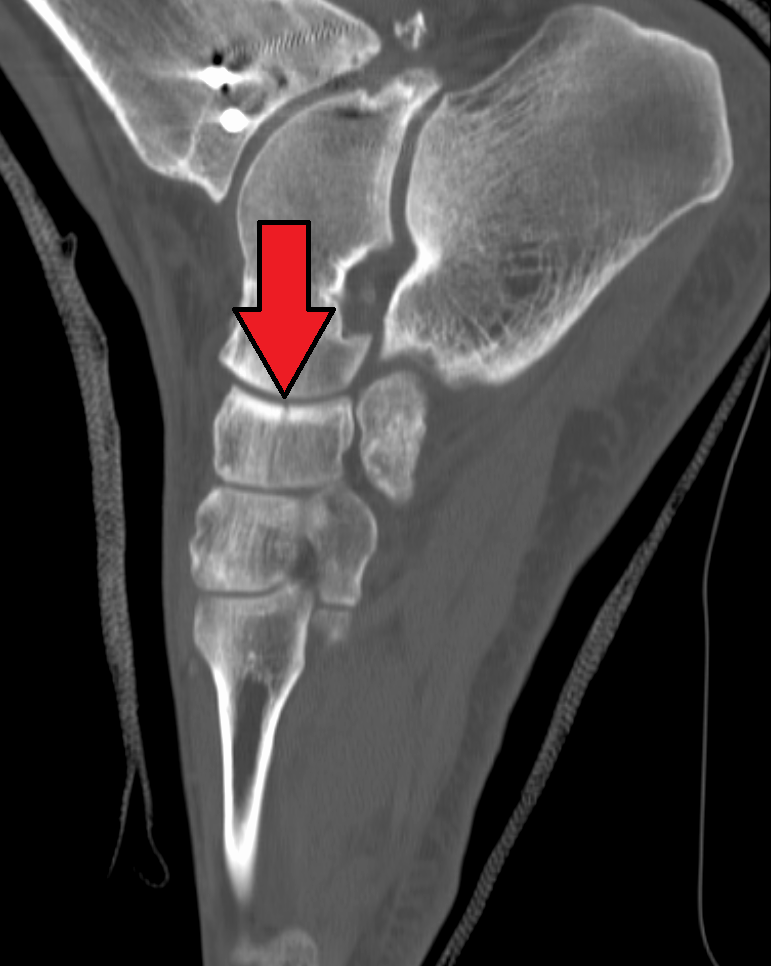
Fracture of the navicular bone

The tibialis posterior is the only muscle that attaches to the navicular bone. The main portion of the muscle inserts into the tuberosity of the navicular bone. An accessory navicular bone may be present in 2–14% of the general population.

=== Clinical significance ===
The human navicular is not a commonly broken bone but it breaks due to two reasons. The first mechanism is a stress fracture which happens commonly in athletes, and the other mechanism is a high energy trauma.

The navicular bone is a keystone of the foot: it is part of the coxa pedis and articulates with the talus, first, second and third cuneiform, cuboid and calcaneus. It plays an important role in the biomechanics of the foot, helping in inversion, eversion, and motion; it is a structural link between midfoot and forefoot and it is part of the longitudinal and transverse arch of the foot.

== Horse anatomy ==
The horse has a sesamoid bone called the navicular bone, located within the hoof, that lies on the palmar aspect of the coffin joint between the second phalanx and third phalanx (coffin bone). The navicular bone in the horse is supported by the distal sesamoidean impar ligament and two collateral sesamoidean ligaments. The navicular bursa is located between the flexor surface of the navicular bone and the deep digital flexor tendon, which runs between the bursa and the distal phalanx. The central tarsal bone in the hock of the horse is homologous and analogous to the navicular bone of the human foot, and thus the navicular bone in the horse is a different structure from the eponymously labeled bone in humans.

The navicular region is an important structure in relation to lameness, particularly in the front feet, and is involved with a significant disease process called navicular disease or navicular syndrome. Recently much of the original literature concerning navicular disease has been called into question, particularly the significance of radiographic changes as a sole diagnostic criterion. Navicular syndrome may be responsible for as much as 1/3 of all cases of lameness in horses, but radiographic changes in the navicular bone do not always provide a definitive diagnosis. Newer imaging techniques have shown that damage to the soft tissues in the region may be significant contributors to lameness and that multiple causes may result in visible lameness.

== See also ==
- Bone terminology
- Terms for anatomical location
- Equine forelimb anatomy
