= Talus bone =

One of the foot bones that forms the tarsus

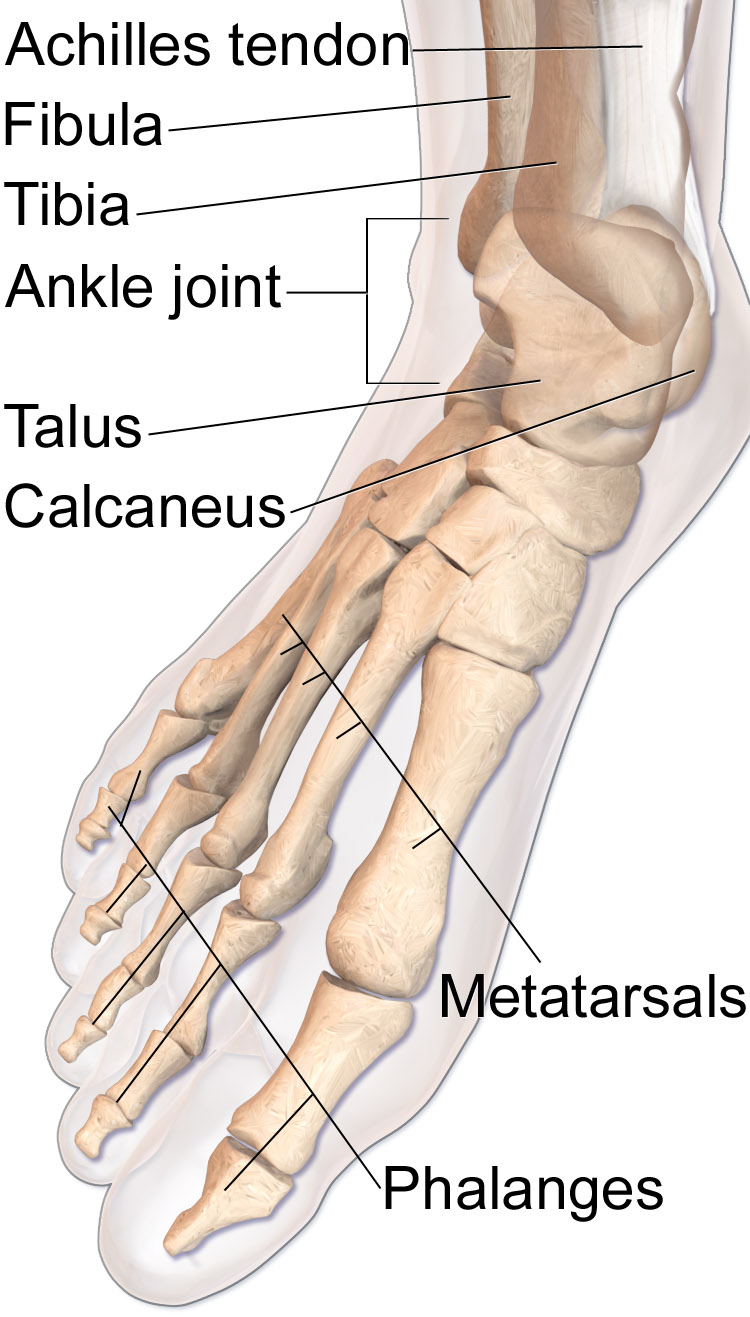
- Anatomy of the right foot

- Subtalar joint, viewed from an angle between lateral and frontal.

Details

Identifiers
- Latin: os talus, astragalus
- MeSH: D013628
- TA98: A02.5.10.001
- TA2: 1448
- FMA: 9708

The talus (/ˈteɪləs/; Latin for ankle or ankle bone; pl.: tali), talus bone, astragalus (/əˈstræɡələs/), or ankle bone is one of the group of foot bones known as the tarsus. The tarsus forms the lower part of the ankle joint. It transmits the entire weight of the body from the lower legs to the foot.

The talus has joints with the two bones of the lower leg, the tibia and thinner fibula. These leg bones have two prominences (the lateral and medial malleoli) that articulate with the talus. At the foot end, within the tarsus, the talus articulates with the calcaneus (heel bone) below, and with the curved navicular bone in front; together, these foot articulations form the ball-and-socket-shaped talocalcaneonavicular joint.

The talus is the second largest of the tarsal bones; it is also one of the bones in the human body with the highest percentage of its surface area covered by articular cartilage. It is also unusual in that it has a retrograde blood supply, i.e. arterial blood enters the bone at the distal end.

In humans, no muscles attach to the talus, unlike most bones, and its position therefore depends on the position of the neighbouring bones.

== In humans ==
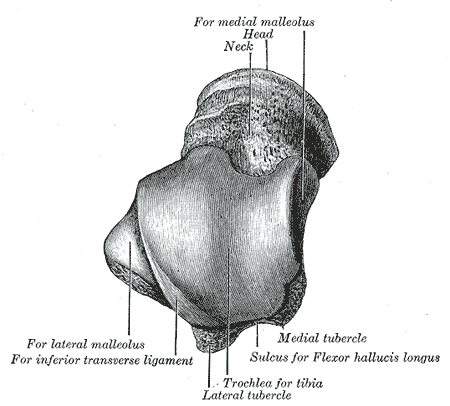
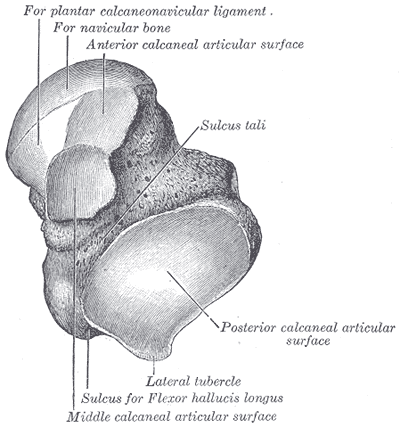
Left talus, from above and below, with anterior side of the bone at top of image

Though irregular in shape, the talus can be subdivided into three parts.

Facing anteriorly, the head carries the articulate surface of the navicular bone, and the neck, the roughened area between the body and the head, has small vascular channels.

The body features several prominent articulate surfaces: On its superior side is the trochlea tali, which is semi-cylindrical, and it is flanked by the articulate facets for the two malleoli. The ankle mortise, the fork-like structure of the malleoli, holds these three articulate surfaces in a steady grip, which guarantees the stability of the ankle joint. However, because the trochlea is wider in front than at the back (approximately 5–6 mm) the stability in the joint vary with the position of the foot: with the foot dorsiflexed (toes pulled upward) the ligaments of the joint are kept stretched, which guarantees the stability of the joint; but with the foot plantarflexed (as when standing on the toes) the narrower width of the trochlea causes the stability to decrease. Behind the trochlea is a posterior process with a medial and a lateral tubercle separated by a groove for the tendon of the flexor hallucis longus. Exceptionally, the lateral of these tubercles forms an independent bone called os trigonum or accessory talus; it may represent the tarsale proximale intermedium. On the bone's inferior side, three articular surfaces serve for the articulation with the calcaneus, and several variously developed articular surfaces exist for the articulation with ligaments.

For descriptive purposes the talus bone is divided into three sections, neck, body, and head.

=== Head ===
The talus bone of the ankle joint connects the leg to the foot.

The head of talus looks forward and medialward; its anterior articular or navicular surface is large, oval, and convex. Its inferior surface has two facets, which are best seen in the fresh condition.

The medial, situated in front of the middle calcaneal facet, is convex, triangular, or semi-oval in shape, and rests on the plantar calcaneonavicular ligament; the lateral, named the anterior calcaneal articular surface, is somewhat flattened, and articulates with the facet on the upper surface of the anterior part of the calcaneus.

=== Neck ===
The neck of talus is directed anteromedially, and comprises the constricted portion of the bone between the body and the oval head.

Its upper and medial surfaces are rough, for the attachment of ligaments; its lateral surface is concave and is continuous below with the deep groove for the interosseous talocalcaneal ligament.

=== Body ===
Talus in red, showing surrounding bones

The body of the talus comprises most of the volume of the talus bone (ankle bone). It presents with five surfaces; a superior, inferior, medial, lateral and a posterior:

- The superior surface of the body presents, behind, a smooth trochlear surface, the trochlea, for articulation with the tibia. The trochlea is broader in front than behind, convex from before backward, slightly concave from side to side: in front it is continuous with the upper surface of the neck of the bone.
- the inferior surface presents two articular areas, the posterior and middle calcaneal surfaces, separated from one another by a deep groove, the sulcus tali. The groove runs obliquely forward and lateralward, becoming gradually broader and deeper in front: in the articulated foot it lies above a similar groove upon the upper surface of the calcaneus, and forms, with it, a canal (sinus tarsi) filled up in the fresh state by the interosseous talocalcaneal ligament. The posterior calcaneal articular surface is large and of an oval or oblong form. It articulates with the corresponding facet on the upper surface of the calcaneus, and is deeply concave in the direction of its long axis which runs forward and lateralward at an angle of about 45° with the median plane of the body. The middle calcaneal articular surface is small, oval in form and slightly convex; it articulates with the upper surface of the sustentaculum tali of the calcaneus.
- The medial surface presents at its upper part a pear-shaped articular facet for the medial malleolus, continuous above with the trochlea; below the articular surface is a rough depression for the attachment of the deep portion of the deltoid ligament of the ankle-joint.
- The lateral surface carries a large triangular facet, concave from above downward, for articulation with the lateral malleolus; its anterior half is continuous above with the trochlea; and in front of it is a rough depression for the attachment of the anterior talofibular ligament. Between the posterior half of the lateral border of the trochlea and the posterior part of the base of the fibular articular surface is a triangular facet which comes into contact with the transverse inferior tibiofibular ligament during flexion of the ankle-joint; below the base of this facet is a groove which affords attachment to the posterior talofibular ligament.
- The posterior surface is narrow, and traversed by a groove running obliquely downward and medialward, and transmitting the tendon of the Flexor hallucis longus. Lateral to the groove is a prominent tubercle, the posterior process, to which the posterior talofibular ligament is attached; this process is sometimes separated from the rest of the talus, and is then known as the os trigonum. Medial to the groove is a second smaller tubercle.

=== Development ===
During the 7th to 8th intrauterine month an ossification center is formed in the anklebone.

=== Fracture ===
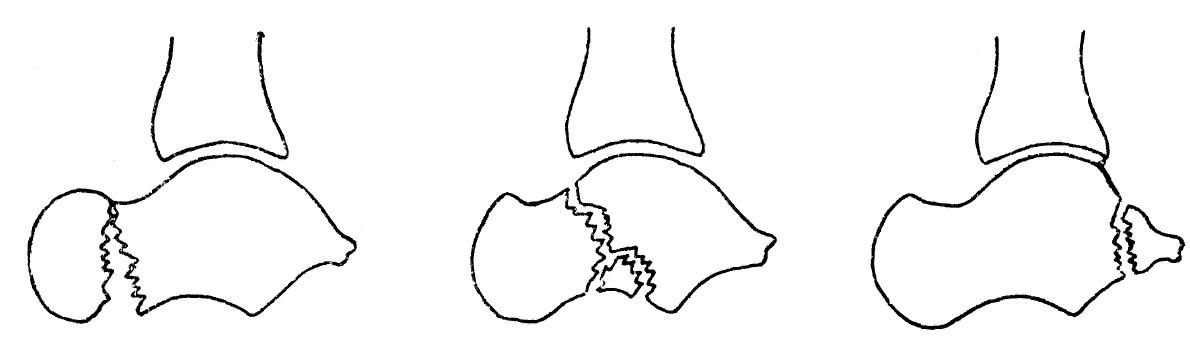
From left to right: Fracture of the neck, body and posterior process of the talus

The talus bone lacks a good blood supply. Because of this, healing a broken talus can take longer than most other bones. One with a broken talus may not be able to walk for many months without crutches and will further wear a walking cast or boot of some kind after that.

Talus injuries may be difficult to recognize, and lateral process fractures in particular may be radiographically occult. If not recognized and managed appropriately, a talus fracture may result in complications and long-term morbidity. A 2015 review came to the conclusion that isolated talar body fractures may be more common than previously thought.

A fractured talar body often has a displacement that is best visualised using CT imaging. In case a talus fracture is accompanied by a dislocation, restoration of articular and axial alignment is necessary to optimize ankle and hindfoot function.

== As dice ==
Dice were originally made from the talus of hoofed animals, leading to the nickname "bones" for dice. Colloquially known as "knucklebones", these are approximately tetrahedral. Modern Mongolians still use such bones as shagai for games and fortune-telling, with each piece relating to a symbolic meaning.

== In other animals ==
The talus apparently derives from the fusion of three separate bones in the feet of primitive amphibians; the tibiale, articulating with tibia, the intermedium, between the bases of the tibia and fibula, and the fourth centrale, lying in the mid-part of the tarsus. These bones are still partially separate in modern amphibians, which therefore do not have a true talus.

The talus forms a considerably more flexible joint in mammals than it does in reptiles. This reaches its greatest extent in artiodactyls, where the distal surface of the bone has a smooth keel to allow greater freedom of movement of the foot, and thus increase running speed.

In non-mammal amniotes, the talus is generally referred to as the astragalus.

In modern crocodiles, the astragalus bears a peg which inserts into a corresponding socket on the calcaneum, and the hinge of the ankle joint runs between the two tarsals; this condition is referred to as "croc-normal"; this "croc-normal" condition was likely ancestral for archosaurs. In dinosaurs (including modern birds) and pterosaurs, the hinge of the ankle instead is distal to the two tarsals. Far rarer are archosaurs with a "croc-reversed" ankle joint, in which the calcaneus bears a peg whilst the astragalus bears a socket.

In the theropod dinosaur lineage leading to birds, the astragalus gradually increases in size until it forms the entire proximal facet of the ankle articulation; additionally the anterior ascending process gradually extends increasingly proximally. In modern birds, the astragalus is fused with the tibia to form the tibiotarsus.

== Additional images ==
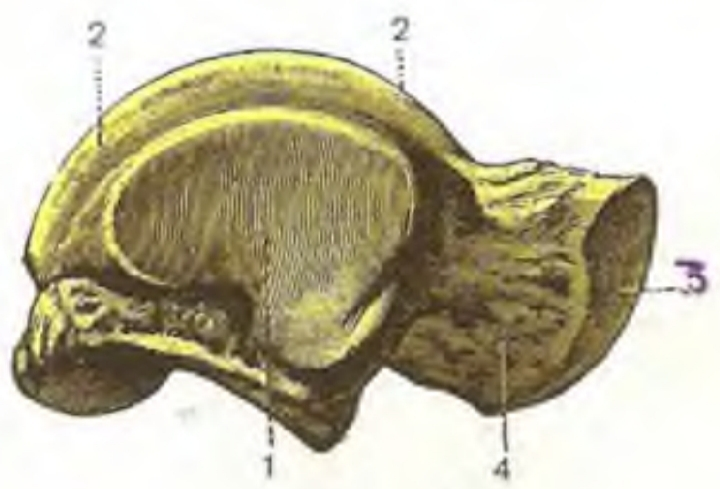
Talus of the right foot. Lateral view. (After Testut's Anatomy.)

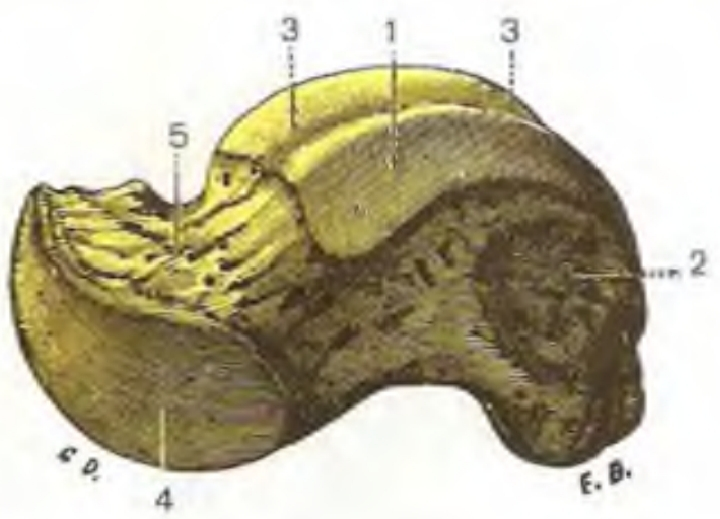
Talus of the right foot. Medial view. (After Testut's Anatomy.)

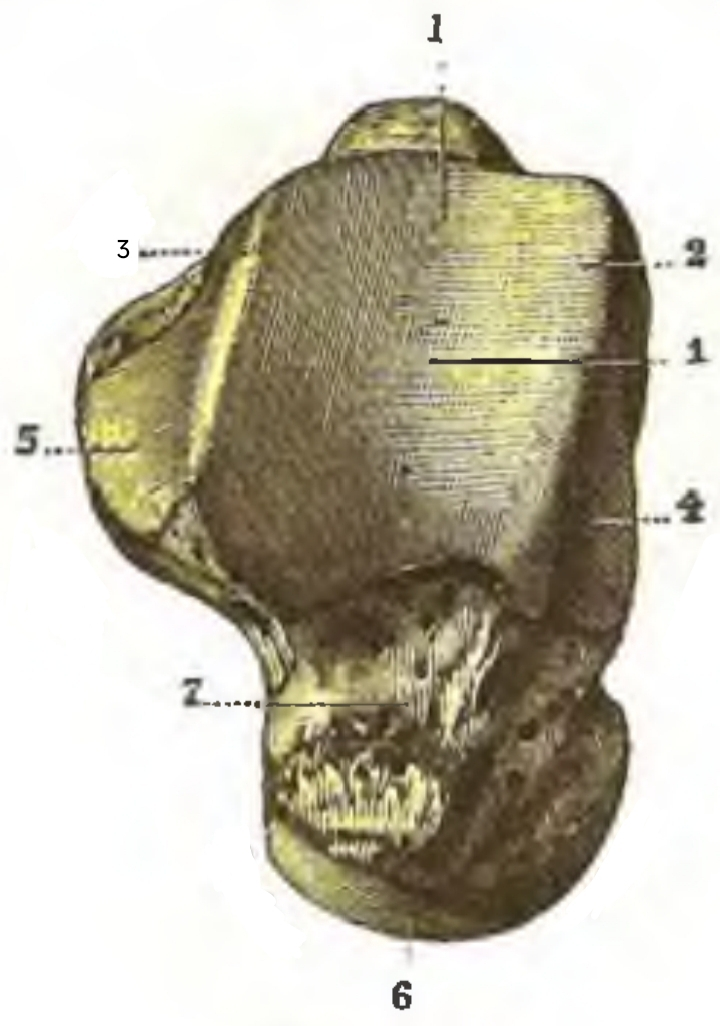
Talus of the right foot. Superior view. (After Testut's Anatomy.)

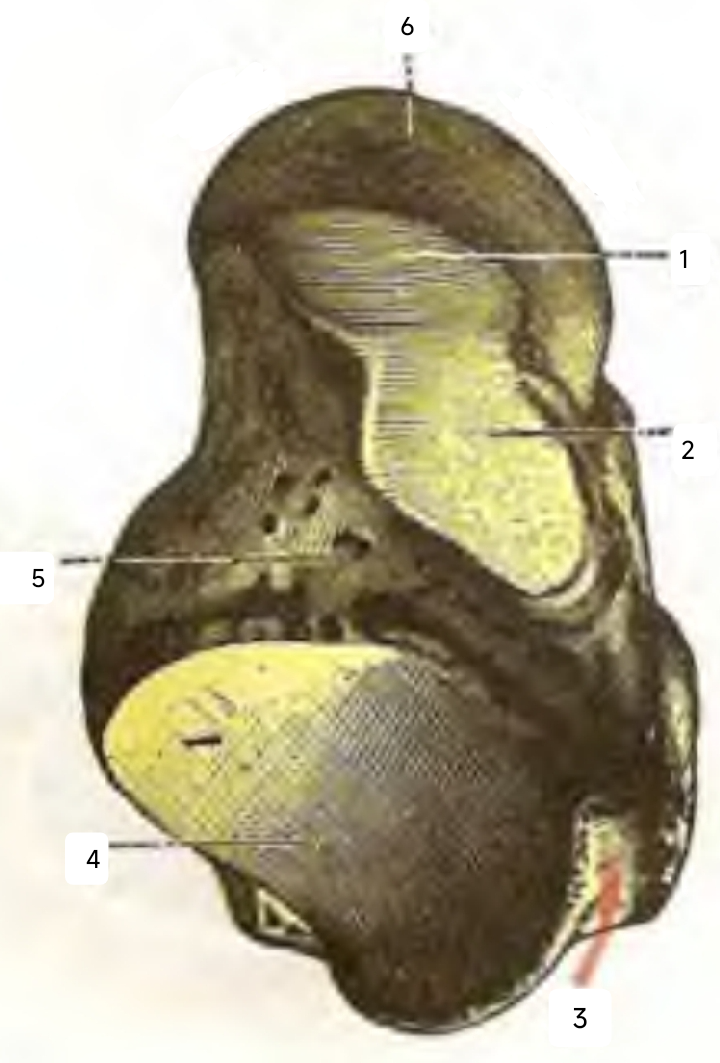
Talus of the right foot. Inferior view. (After Testut's Anatomy.)

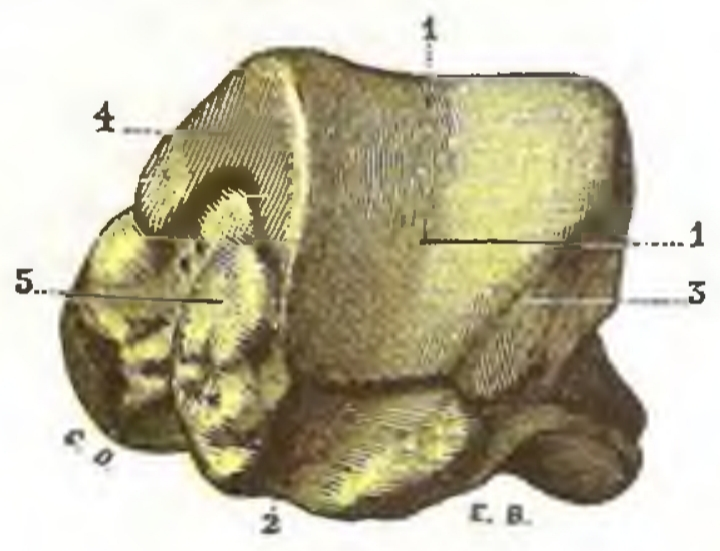
Talus of the right foot. Posterior view. (After Testut's Anatomy.)

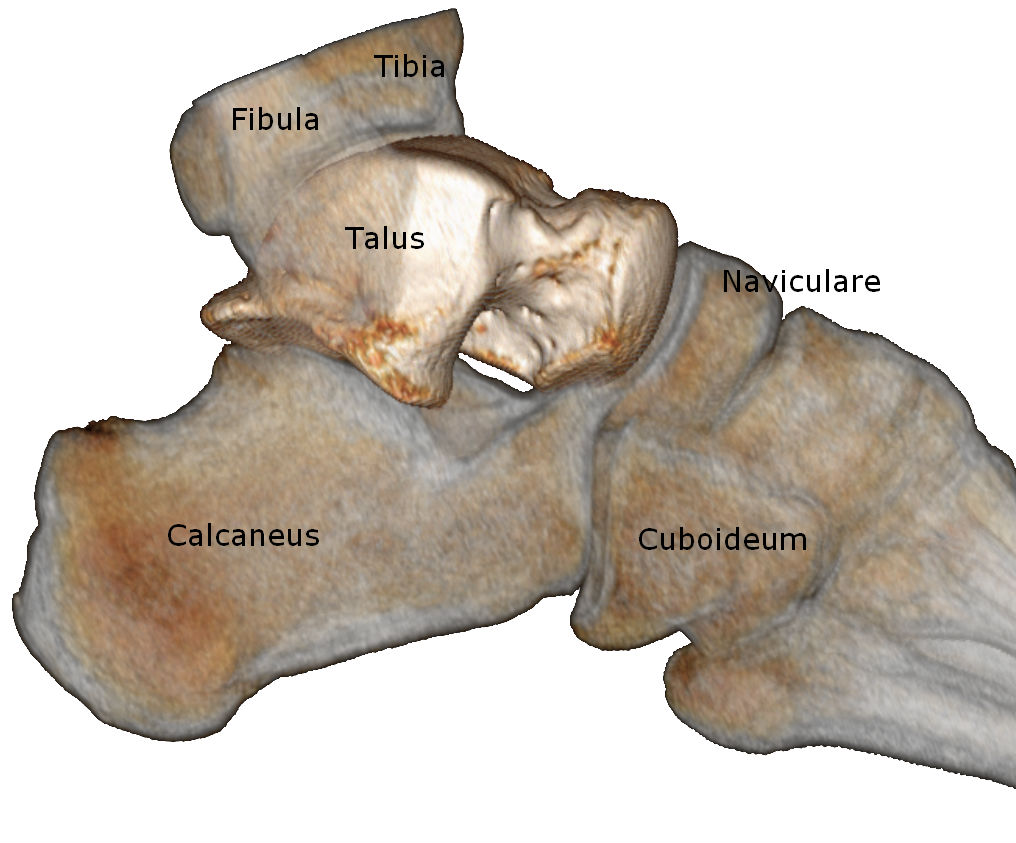
Imaging of an articulated right-sided talus (lateral view)

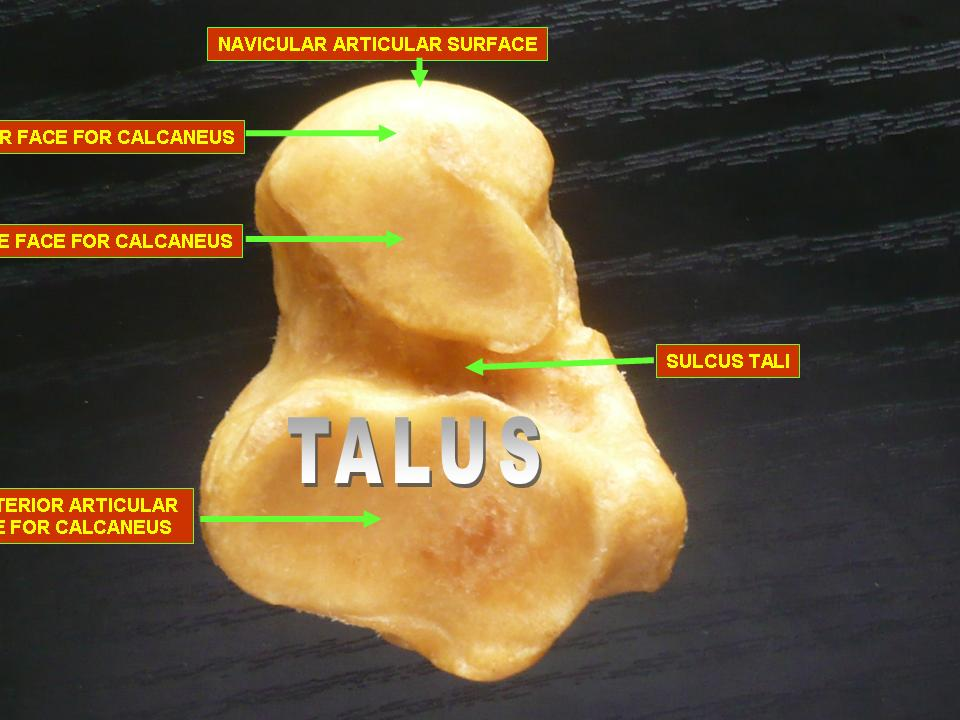
Inferior aspect of a right-sided talus bone.

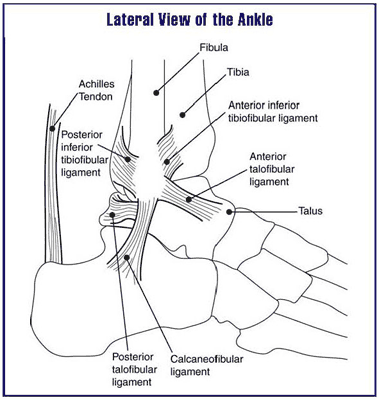
Lateral view of the human ankle, including the talus

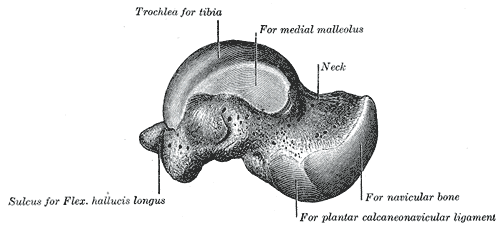
Left talus, medial surface

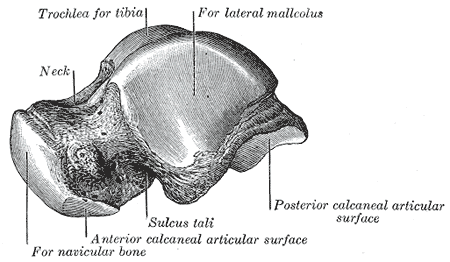
Left talus, lateral surface

== See also ==
- Astragalomancy, a form of divination using talus bones
- Knucklebones, a dice game using astragali
- Shagai, sheep or goat talus bones used for gaming by Mongolians
- Squatting facets
