= Calcaneus =

Bone of the tarsus of the foot

- The calcaneus forms the bony part of the heel. It forms a joint with the talus bone, the subtalar joint.

- Bones of the foot, with the calcaneus shown in red

Details

Identifiers
- Latin: calcaneus, calcaneum, os calcis
- MeSH: D002111
- TA98: A02.5.11.001
- TA2: 1468
- FMA: 24496

The calcaneus (/kælˈkeɪniəs/; from the Latin calcaneus or calcaneum, meaning heel; pl.: calcanei or calcanea) or heel bone is a bone of the tarsus of the foot which constitutes the heel. In humans, it attaches several muscles and the plantar fascia. In some animals, it is the point of the hock.

== Structure ==
In humans, the calcaneus is the largest of the tarsal bones and the largest bone of the foot. Its long axis is pointed forwards and laterally. The talus bone, calcaneus, and navicular bone are considered the proximal row of tarsal bones. In the calcaneus, several important structures can be distinguished:

There is a large calcaneal tuberosity located posteriorly on plantar surface with medial and lateral tubercles on its surface. Besides, there is another peroneal tubercle on its lateral surface. On its lower edge on either side are its lateral and medial processes (serving as the origins of the abductor hallucis and abductor digiti minimi). The Achilles tendon is inserted into a roughened area on its superior side and the cuboid bone articulates with its anterior side. On its superior side there are three articular surfaces for the articulation with the talus bone. Between these superior articulations and the equivalents on the talus is the tarsal sinus (a canal occupied by the interosseous talocalcaneal ligament). At the upper and forepart of the medial surface of the calcaneus, below the middle talar facet, there is a horizontal eminence, the sustentaculum tali ("shelf of the talus"). The sustentaculum tali gives attachment to the plantar calcaneonavicular (spring) ligament, tibiocalcaneal ligament, and medial talocalcaneal ligament. This eminence is concave above, and articulates with the middle calcaneal articular surface of the talus; below, it is grooved for the tendon of the flexor hallucis longus; its anterior margin gives attachment to the plantar calcaneonavicular ligament, and its medial margin to a part of the deltoid ligament of the ankle-joint.

On the lateral side is commonly a tubercle called the fibular trochlea (or peroneal tubercle). This is a raised projection located between the tendons of the fibularis longus and brevis. It separates the two oblique grooves of the lateral surface of the calcaneus (for the tendons of the fibularis muscles).

Its chief anatomical significance is as a point of divergence of the previously common pathway shared by the distal tendons of fibularis longus and fibularis brevis en route to their distinct respective attachment sites.

The calcaneus is part of two joints: the proximal intertarsal joint and the talocalcaneal joint. The point of the calcaneus is covered by the calcanean bursa.

=== Development ===
Like other limb bones, the calcaneus derives from lateral plate mesoderm. In the calcaneus, an ossification center develops during the 4th–7th week of fetal development.

== Function ==
Three muscles insert on the calcaneus: the gastrocnemius, soleus, and plantaris. These muscles are part of the posterior compartment of the leg and aid in walking, running and jumping. Their specific functions include plantarflexion of the foot, flexion of the knee, and steadying the leg on the ankle during standing. The calcaneus also serves as origin for several short muscles that run along the sole of the foot and control the toes.

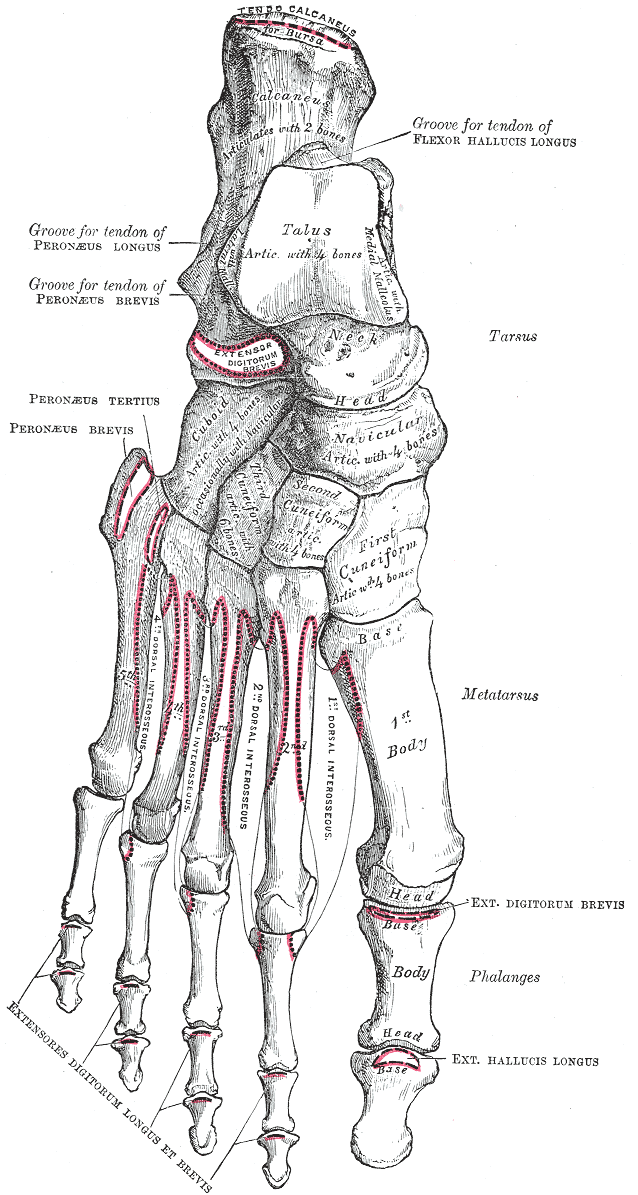
Muscle attachments (seen from above)

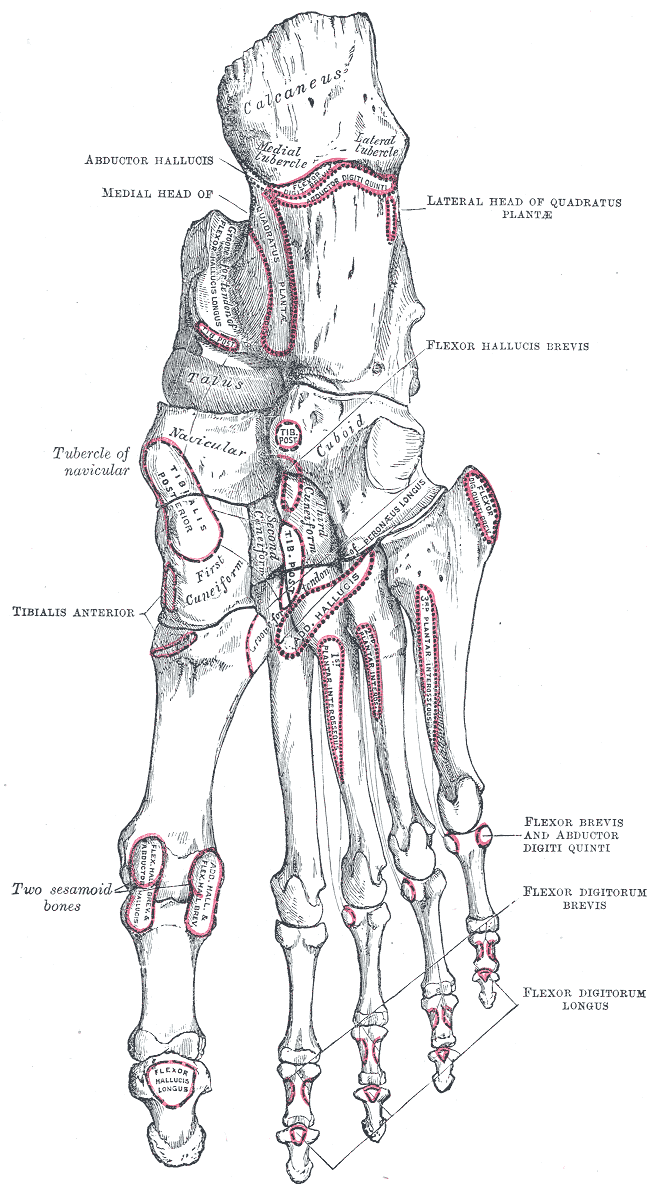
Muscle attachments (seen from below)

Muscle	Direction	Attachment
Gastrocnemius	Insertion	Calcaneal tuberosity through the Achilles tendon
Soleus	Insertion	Calcaneal tuberosity through the Achilles tendon
Plantaris	Insertion	Calcaneal tuberosity through the Achilles tendon
Extensor digitorum brevis	Origin	Dorsal side of calcaneus
Abductor hallucis	Origin	Medial process of calcaneal tuberosity
Extensor hallucis brevis	Origin	Dorsal side of calcaneus
Abductor digiti minimi	Origin	Lateral and medial processes of calcaneal tuberosity
Flexor digitorum brevis	Origin	Medial process of calcaneal tuberosity
Quadratus plantae	Origin	Lateral process of calcaneal tuberosity

== Clinical significance ==
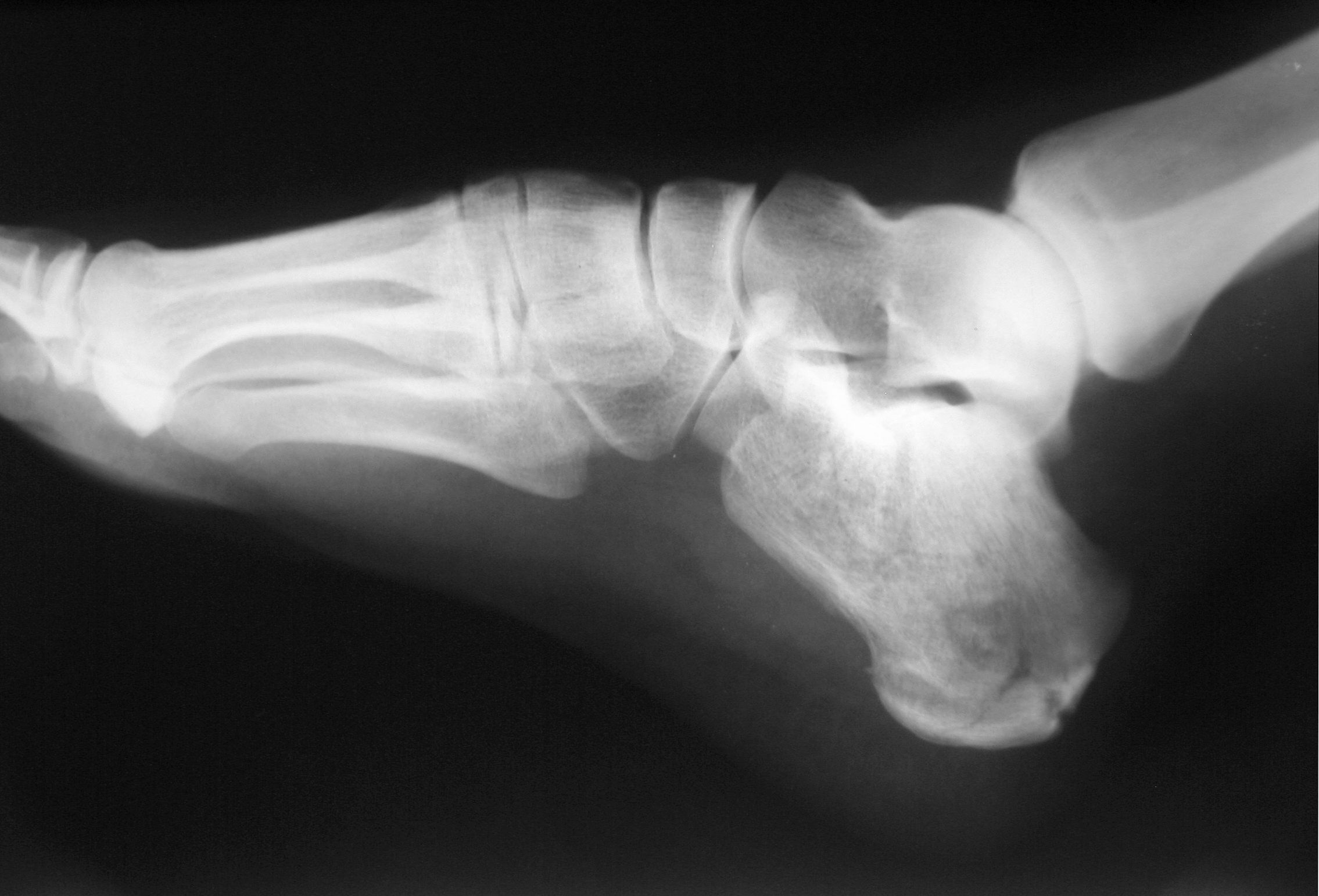
Calcaneus fracture X-ray

Normally the tibia sits vertically above the calcaneus (pes rectus). If the calcaneal axis between these two bones is turned medially the foot is in an everted position (pes valgus), and if it is turned laterally the foot is in an inverted position (pes varus).

- Calcaneal fracture, also known as lover's fracture and Don Juan fracture

== Disease ==
The talar shelf is typically involved in subtalar or talocalcaneal tarsal coalition.

== See also ==
- Calcar
- Bohler's angle
- Sanders classification

== Additional images ==
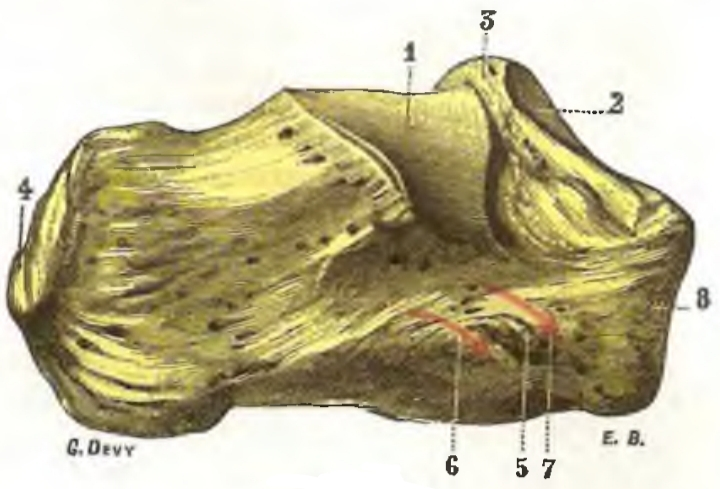
Calcaneus of the right foot; lateral view. (After Testut's Anatomy.)

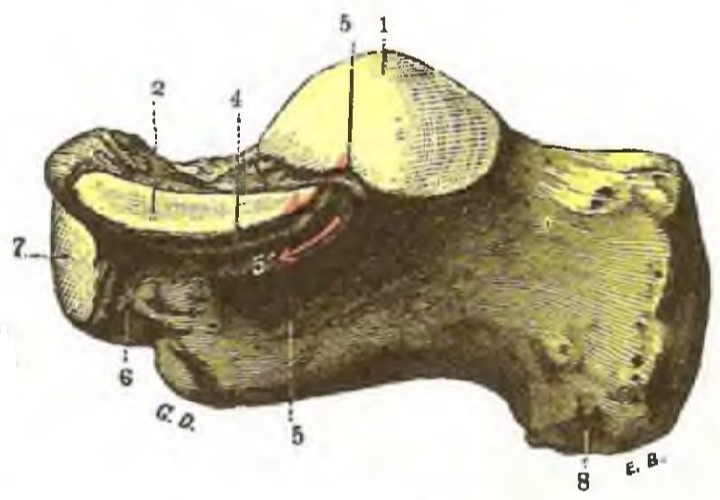
Calcaneus of the right foot; medial view. (After Testut's Anatomy.)

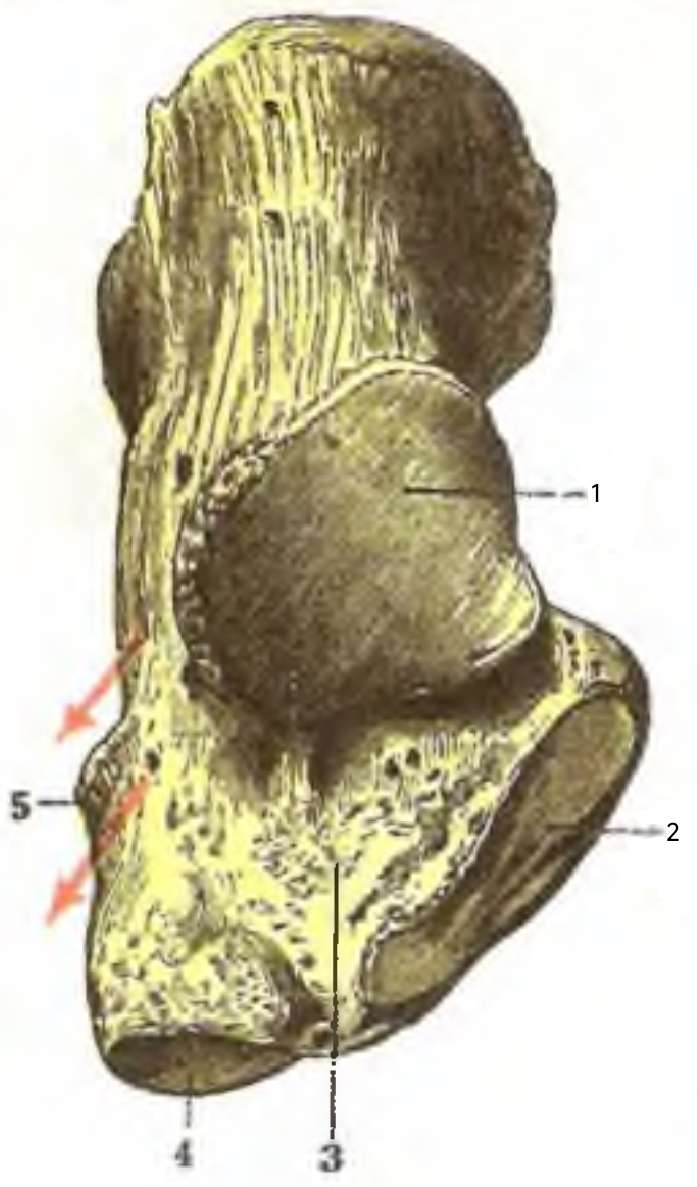
Calcaneus of the right foot; superior view. (After Testut's Anatomy.)

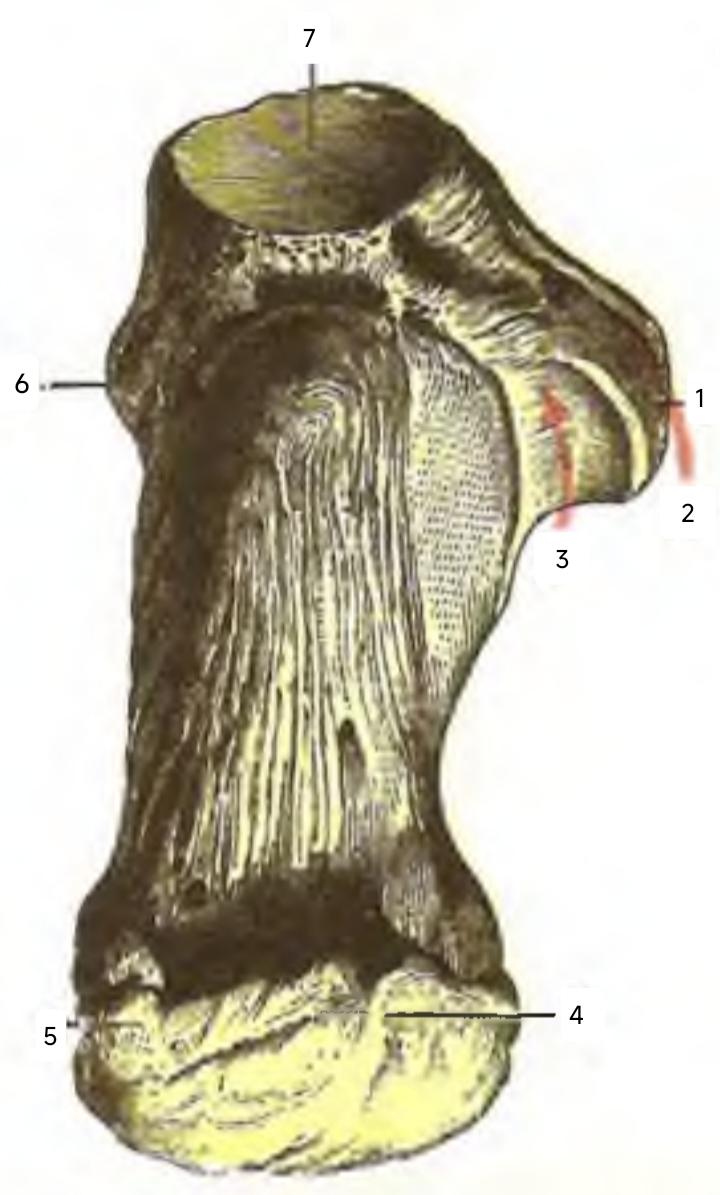
Calcaneus of the right foot; inferior view. (After Testut's Anatomy.)

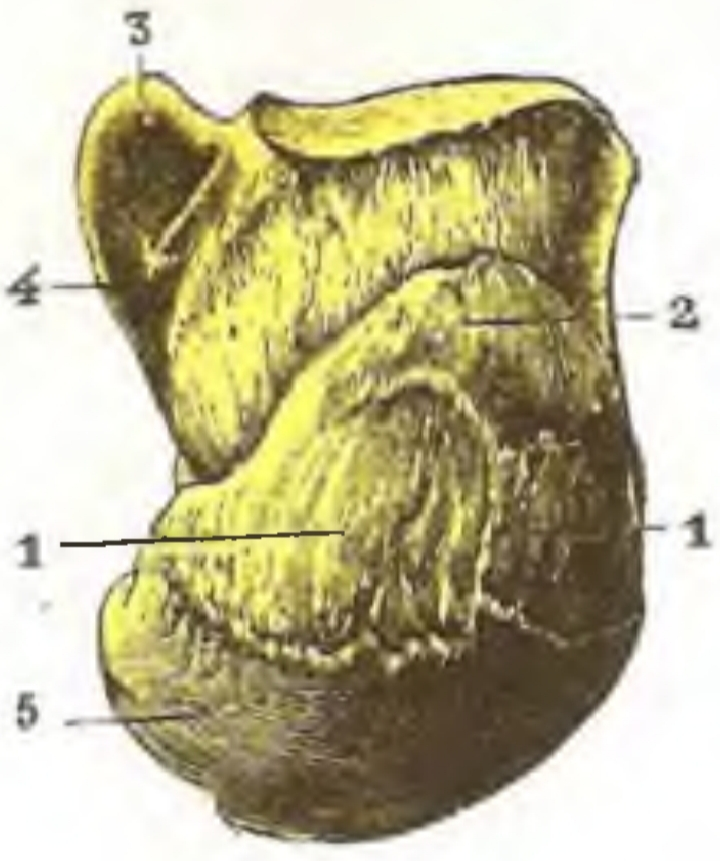
Calcaneus of the right root; posterior view. (After Testut's Anatomy.)

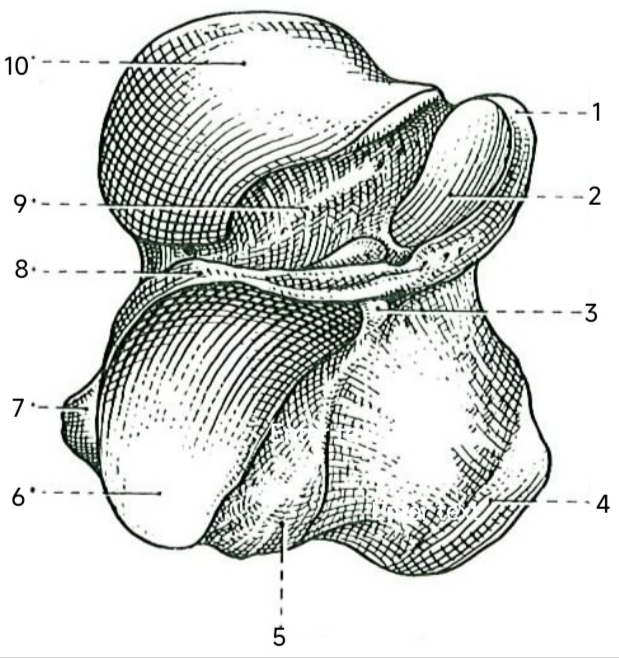
Calcaneus of the right foot; anterior view. (After Charpy.)

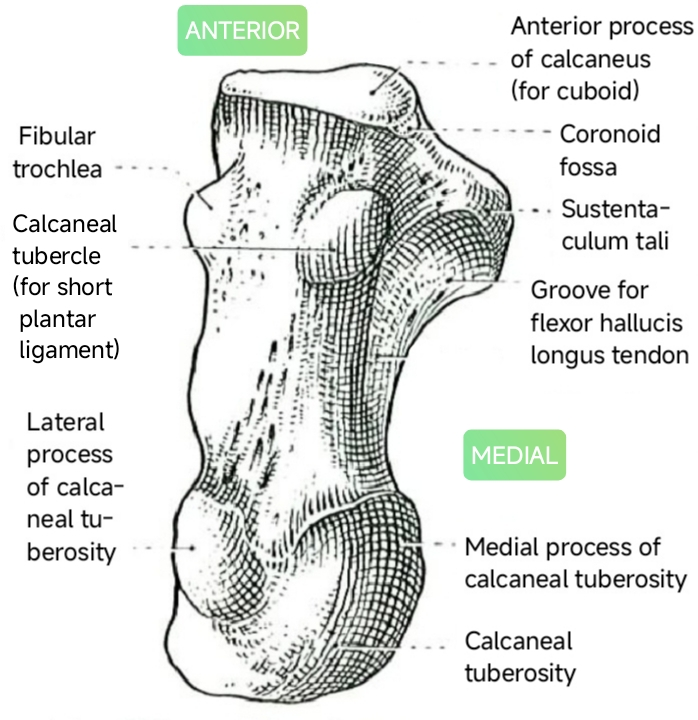
Labeled illustration depicting the inferior aspect of a right calcaneus. (After Charpy.)

Bones of foot

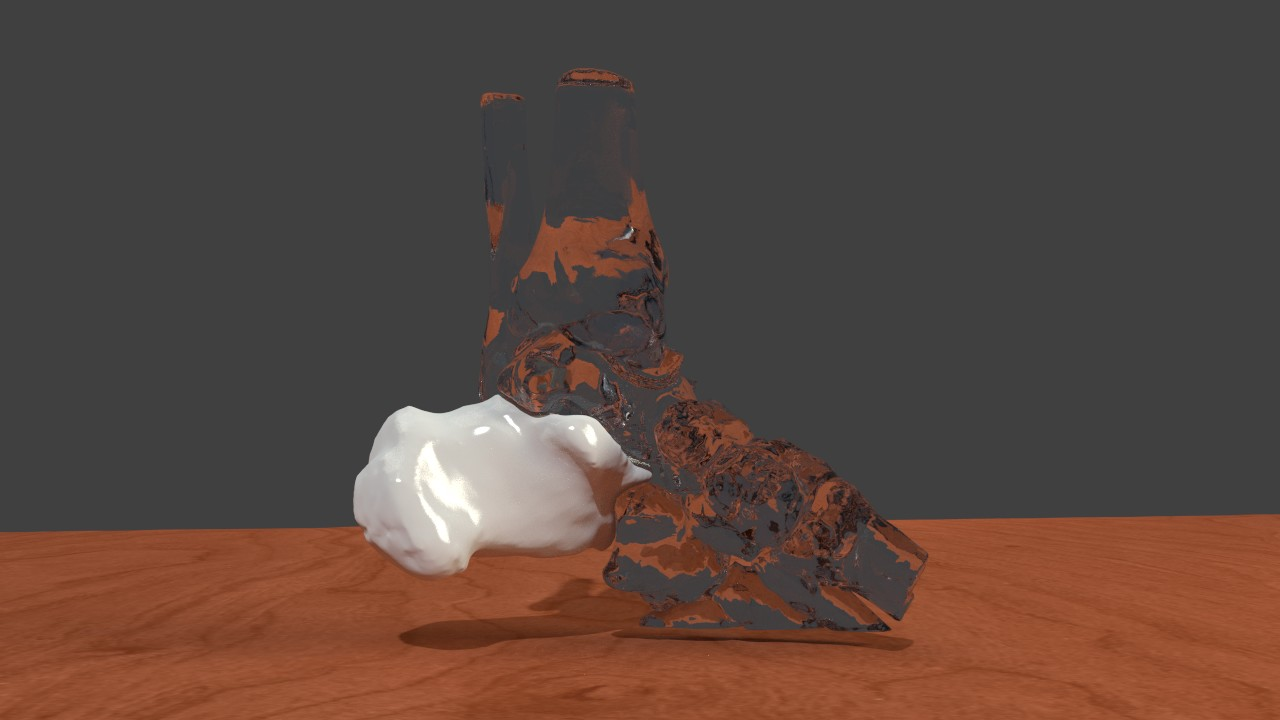
3D rendering of a left calcaneus derived from CT scan data. The calcaneus is white, and the other bones of the foot and ankle are clear to illustrate the position and relationship of the calcaneus to the other tarsal bones.
