= Running injuries =

- Other names: Running-related injuries (RRI)
- Specialty: Sports medicine

Running injuries (or running-related injuries, RRI) affect about half of runners annually. The frequencies of various RRI depend on the type of running, such as speed and mileage. Some injuries are acute, caused by sudden overstress, such as side stitch, strains, and sprains. Many of the common injuries that affect runners are chronic, developing over longer periods as the result of overuse. Common overuse injuries include shin splints, stress fractures, Achilles tendinitis, Iliotibial band syndrome, Patellofemoral pain (runner's knee), and plantar fasciitis.

Proper running form is important in injury prevention. A major aspect of running form is foot strike pattern. The way in which the foot makes contact with the ground determines how the force of the impact is distributed throughout the body. Different types of modern running shoes are created to adjust the foot strike pattern in an effort to reduce the risk of injury. In recent years, barefoot running has increased in popularity in many Western countries, because of claims that it reduces the risk of injury. However, this has not been proven and is still debated.

== Overview ==
"The causes of running injuries are so multifactorial and diverse, and apparently vary greatly from individual to individual, that any preventive measure proposed would probably be of help to only a small minority. The only obvious exception would be, of course, the reduction in jogging activity itself. A recent study came to the same unspectacular conclusion. … We suspect, however, that it would be as difficult to motivate determined joggers to decrease their injury risk by cutting down on mileage as it would be to motivate the sedentary population to decrease its cardiovascular risk by taking up activities such as jogging."

"A prospective cohort study of 300 runners followed for two years showed that 73 percent of women and 62 percent of men sustained an injury, with 56 percent of the injured runners sustaining more than one injury during the study period."

A prospective cohort study of 76 runners followed for one year showed that 51 percent reported an injury. Injured runners were heavier. "Over 60% of male injured runners and over 50% of female injured runners had increased their weekly running distance by >30% between consecutive weeks at least once in the 4 weeks prior to injury."

"… an evolutionary perspective indicates that we did not evolve to run long distances at fast speeds on a regular basis. As a result, it is unlikely there was selection for the human body to cope with some of the extreme demands runners place on their bodies."

== Acute injuries ==
=== Side stitch ===
A side stitch is an intense stabbing abdominal pain under the lower edge of the ribcage that occurs during exercise. It is also called a side ache, side cramp, muscle stitch, or simply a stitch, and the medical term is Exercise-related Transient Abdominal Pain (ETAP). It sometimes extends to shoulder tip pain, and commonly occurs during running, swimming, and horseback riding. Approximately two-thirds of runners will experience at least one episode of a stitch each year. The precise cause is unclear, although it most likely involves irritation of the abdominal lining, and the condition is more likely after consuming a meal or a sugary beverage. If the pain is present only when exercising and is completely absent at rest, in an otherwise healthy person, it does not require investigation. Typical treatment strategies involve deep breathing and/or manual pressure on the affected area.

=== Strains ===
A strain is an injury that occurs to a muscle, tendon, or both. Generally, the muscle or tendon overstretches and partially tears, under more physical stress than it can withstand, often from a sudden increase in duration, intensity, or frequency of an activity. Strains most commonly occur in the foot, leg, or back. Immediate treatment typically includes five steps abbreviated as PRICE: protection, rest, ice, compression, elevation.

=== Sprains ===
A sprain, also known as a torn ligament, is the stretching or tearing of ligaments within a joint, often caused by an injury abruptly forcing the joint beyond its functional range of motion. Ligaments are tough, inelastic fibers made of collagen that connect two or more bones to form a joint. Sprains can occur at any joint but most commonly occur in the ankle, knee, or wrist. The majority of sprains are mild, causing minor swelling and bruising that can be resolved with conservative treatment, typically summarized as RICE: rest, ice, compression, elevation. However, severe sprains involve complete tears, ruptures, or fractures, often leading to joint instability, severe pain, and decreased functional ability. These sprains require surgical fixation, prolonged immobilization, and physical therapy.

=== Morton's neuroma ===
Morton's neuroma is a tightening of the tissues surrounding the nerves leading into your toes. This is caused by wearing shoes with a narrow toe bed, like high heels, or in high-impact activities like running or jogging. Treatments can include switching to a shoe with a wider toe bed, the use of inserts in your shoe, cortisol shots, or in extreme cases, surgery can be done to remove the affected nerve.

== Overuse injuries ==
=== Causes and prevention ===
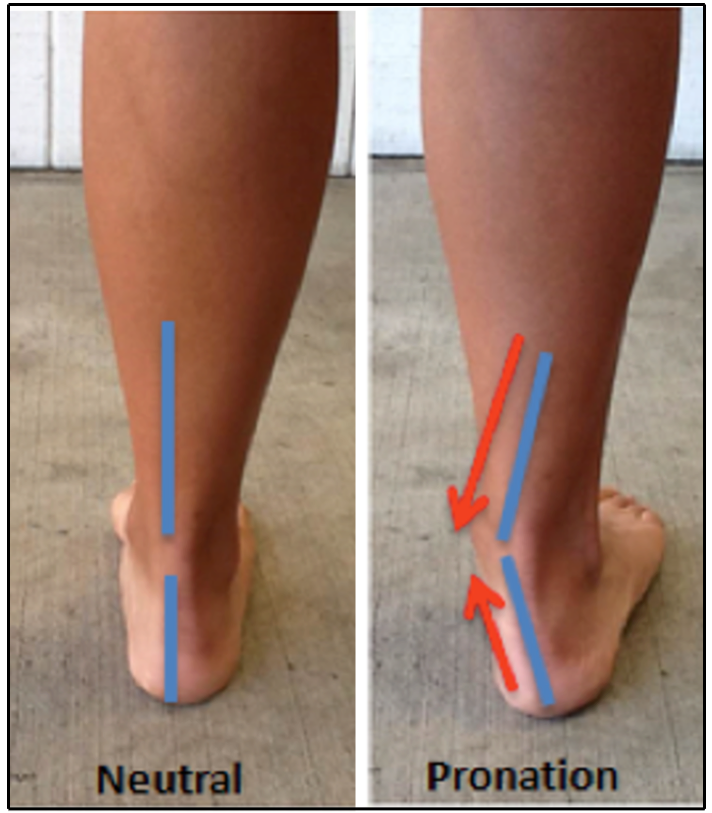
Pronation, neutral, and supination placements of the right ankle. The ankle and foot naturally pronate and supinate by about 5 degrees while walking or running. The red arrows indicate excessive pronation.

In general, overuse injuries are the result of repetitive impact between the foot and the ground. With improper running form, the force of the impact can be distributed abnormally throughout the feet and legs. Running form tends to worsen with fatigue. When moving at a constant pace along a straight path, a symmetrical gait is considered to be normal. Asymmetry is considered to be a risk factor for injury. One study attempted to quantify the change in running form between a rested and fatigued state by measuring asymmetrical running gait in the lower limbs. The results showed that "knee internal rotation and knee stiffness became more asymmetrical with fatigue, increasing by 14% and 5.3%, respectively." These findings suggest that focusing on proper running form, particularly when fatigued, could reduce the risk of running-related injuries. Running in worn-out shoes may also increase the risk of injury, and altering the footwear might be helpful. These injuries can also arise due to a sudden increase in the intensity or amount of exercise.

=== Shin splints ===
A shin splint, also known as Medial Tibial Stress Syndrome (MTSS), is pain along the inside edge of the shinbone (tibia) due to inflammation of tissue in the area. Generally this is between the middle of the lower leg to the ankle. The pain may be dull or sharp, and is generally brought on by high-impact exercise that overloads the tibia. Groups that are commonly affected include runners (especially on concrete or asphalt), dancers, gymnasts, and military personnel. Rates of shin splints in at-risk groups range from 4% to 35%. The condition occurs more often in women. Shin splints are generally treated by rest followed by a gradual return to exercise over a period of weeks.

=== Stress fractures ===
A stress fracture is a fatigue-induced bone fracture caused by repeated stress over time. Instead of resulting from a single severe impact, stress fractures are the result of accumulated injury from repeated submaximal loading, such as running or jumping. Because of this mechanism, stress fractures are common overuse injuries in athletes.

Stress fractures can be described as small cracks in the bone, or "hairline fractures". Stress fractures of the foot are sometimes called "march fractures" because of the injury's prevalence among heavily marching soldiers. Stress fractures most frequently occur in weight-bearing bones of the lower extremities, such as the tibia and fibula (bones of the lower leg), metatarsal and navicular bones (bones of the foot). Less common are stress fractures to the femur, pelvis, and sacrum. Treatment usually consists of rest followed by a gradual return to exercise over a period of months.

=== Achilles tendinitis ===
Achilles tendinitis is inflammation of the Achilles tendon, resulting in pain along the back of the leg near the heel. There are two types of Achilles tendinitis, insertional and noninsertional. Noninsertional Achilles tendinitis is the type that more commonly affects runners. In this case, inflammation is occurring in the middle portion of the tendon, whereas insertional Achilles tendinitis is inflammation located where the tendon connects (inserts) to the heel bone. Having tight calf muscles may also increase the risk of Achilles tendinitis. Stretching the calves before starting heavy exercise may help relieve tightness in the muscles.

=== Patellofemoral pain syndrome ===
Patellofemoral pain syndrome is associated with pain in the knee and around the patella (kneecap). It is sometimes referred to as runner's knee, but this term is also used for other overuse injuries that involve knee pain. It can be caused by a single incident but is often the result of overuse or a sudden increase in physical activity. Patellofemoral pain syndrome is often mistaken for Chondromalacia patellae which is another condition commonly referred to as 'Runner's Knee'. This is because both of them involve pain in or around the patella (knee cap) and this is how they are distinguished from other running injuries like Patellar Tendonitis (Jumper's Knee).

=== Iliotibial band syndrome ===
Iliotibial band syndrome (ITBS) is defined as inflammation of the iliotibial band on the outside of the knee. This inflammation occurs a result of the iliotibial band and the outside of the knee joint rubbing together. The resulting pain typically is initially mild and worsens if running continues. Recurrence is a common issue with iliotibial band syndrome, as pain goes away with a period of rest, but symptoms can easily come back as the runner returns to training. During recovery, the muscles on the outside of the hip can be stretched to reduce tightness in the band.

=== Plantar fasciitis ===
The plantar fascia extends from the heel bone to the toes, and helps support the arch of the foot. Plantar fasciitis is a common cause of heel pain and affects about two million people in the United States. Though once considered an inflammatory condition, plantar fasciitis is now characterized as a degenerative pathology. Intrinsic risk factors include obesity and limited ankle flexibility. Extrinsic risk factors include deconditioning, hard surfaces, inadequate stretching and poor footwear.

=== DNA damage ===
Oxidative DNA damage in peripheral blood cells was found to be higher in runners than in sedentary control subjects. Marathon running can cause muscle and lymphocyte DNA damage, and the amount of such damage appears to increase as running distance increases.

== Footwear ==
=== Traditional running shoes ===
Wearing traditional running shoes protect runners from the typical road debris such as sticks and stones. However, not all runners are made equal in the same way that not all shoes are made for everyone. Certain individuals have neutral feet or normal pronation, where their running motion can best absorb the force of impact. This is when your "foot strikes the ground on the outside toward your heel, your arch lowers as your foot rolls inward toward the center, and you move forward on your foot toward your big toe and push off". In such cases, most traditional running shoes fit these runners best. But for runners with underpronation or overpronation, there must wear certain shoes with specific attributes to address their motion-control issues.

Study participants wearing running shoes with moderate lateral torsional stiffness "were 49% less likely to incur any type of lower extremity injury and 52% less likely to incur an overuse lower extremity injury than" participants wearing running shoes with minimal lateral torsional stiffness, both of which were statistically significant observations." Lateral torsional stiffness can be assessed simply by twisting the heel and toe in opposite directions.

In the 1984 Bern 16 km race questionnaire, runners who had no shoe brand preference and presumably changed brands frequently had significantly fewer running injuries. There was also some correlation between higher shoe price and increased injury but — "It is probably incorrect, however, to interpret this surprising finding to mean that more expensive shoes cause more running injuries…". That group was 1 1/2 minutes slower than expected from their training and had a higher proportion of orthotics use. It may well be that runners with existing injuries hope that expensive shoes will fix their body.

So-called "traditional" running shoes are designed to give more support and cushion the landing to reduce the effects of impact. They allow for more-comfortable running on hard surfaces such as asphalt and also protect the foot when stepping on rocks or other potentially sharp objects. However, "perceived impact is lower than actual impact, which results in inadequate impact-moderating behavior and consequent injury" — too much running.

=== Barefoot running ===
Barefoot running has been promoted as one method of reducing the risk of running-related injuries. Barefoot running is thought to improve running form by encouraging forefoot striking. The collision of the forefoot with the ground generates a significantly smaller impact force in comparison to striking heel first. However, barefoot running leaves the foot unprotected from stepping on sharp objects. Although running barefoot may reduce the risk of running-related injuries, it is important to take time while switching from running with shoes.

Beginning to run barefoot without reducing intensity or mileage of training can actually cause muscle or tendon injury. Changing one's style of running shoe or switching to barefoot running will most likely alter the foot strike pattern, meaning that the force of impact will be absorbed differently. Injuries are more likely to occur in novice barefoot runners. This may be a result of not yet having fully adapted to a new style of running, and therefore running with inconsistent technique. To measure this, a study was conducted involving runners who habitually run with a rearfoot strike while wearing shoes. Of the runners involved in the study, 32% used a heel strike pattern in initial attempts at running barefoot. Running barefoot while heel striking leads to increased muscle activation and impact accelerations. The findings suggest that an inconsistency in running technique among novice barefoot runners may put them at a higher risk of injury in comparison to running with shoes.

=== Minimalist footwear ===
As an intermediate option between traditional running shoes and running barefoot, "minimalist" shoes lack thickly cushioned heels and are designed to encourage forefoot striking. Compared to traditional running shoes, one study observed that high-speed runners in minimalist shoes experienced a significant redistribution of mechanical work from the knee to the ankle. Therefore, minimalist shoes may be beneficial for runners who have experienced a knee injury in the past, although the shoes might increase the risk of ankle and calf injuries. As with barefoot running, runners who switch to minimalist shoes should not start out at full training intensity.
