= Knee examination =

Medical evaluation of the knee

The knee examination, in medicine and physiotherapy, is performed as part of a physical examination, or when a patient presents with knee pain or a history that suggests a pathology of the knee joint.

The exam includes several parts:

- position/lighting/draping
- inspection
- palpation
- motion

The latter three steps are often remembered with the saying look, feel, move.

== History taking ==
Before performing a physical examination of the knee joint, a comprehensive history should be asked. A thorough history can be helpful in locating the possible pathological site during the physical examination. The mechanism of injury, location, character of the knee pain, the presence of a "pop" sound at the time of the injury (indicates ligamentous tear or fracture), swelling, infections, ability to stand or walk, sensation of instability (suggestive of subluxation), or any previous traumatic injuries to the joint are all important historical features. The most common knee problems are: soft tissue inflammation, injury, or osteoarthritis. The mechanism of the knee injury can give a clue of the possible structures that can be injured. For example, applying valgus stress on the knee can cause medial collateral ligament rupture, meanwhile a varus force can cause lateral collateral ligament rupture. When a person suddenly slows down during running, twisting, or pivoting with valgus force applying on the knee, the anterior cruciate ligament can rupture. Posterior dislocation of the tibia can cause posterior cruciate ligament injury. Twisting and pivoting while bearing weight can cause tearing of the meniscus. Fractures of the knee are less common but should be considered if direct trauma to the knee has occurred such as during a fall. Examples of fractures involving knee joints are: tibial plateau fractures, fractures of the lateral condyle of femur, medial condyle of femur, and patellar fractures.

For non-traumatic causes of knee pain, history such as fever, morning stiffness, pain after exercise, infections, history of gout or psoriasis, and previous activities that contributes to long-term overuse of the knee joint should be asked. Knee pain due to long-term overuse are reproducible. For example, repetitive jumping can cause inflammation of patellar tendon. Repetitive kneeling can cause prepatellar inflammation of synovial bursa.

== General examination ==
Physical examination of the knee begins by observing the person's gait to assess for any abnormalities seen while walking. Gait assessment can be used to differentiate genuine knee pain or pain which referred from hip, lower back or the foot. A person can be asked to perform a duckwalk. This requires the person to squat and walk in that position. In order to perform a duckwalk, the person has to be free of ligamentous tear, knee effusions, and meniscal tears. The person can also be asked to stand with both feet stuck together. This position is useful to observe for valgus or varus deformity of the knees which is suggestive of osteoarthritis. The circumference of each thigh can be measured to look for wasting of quadriceps muscles. Skin around the knee can also be observed for psoriasis, hematoma, rash, abrasions, lacerations, or cellulitis which could be important causes of the knee pathology.

== Palpation ==
Palpation of the knee should begin from the unaffected side first. This will reassure the patient and is useful for comparison with the affected knee. The back of the hand can be used to assess the warmth of the knee. The knee is then flexed 90 degrees and the anterior structures are assessed. Inflammation of the patellar tendon is present if the patellar tendon is painful upon palpation. Radiographic imaging should be done if the examination findings fulfills the Ottawa rules: age 55 years and older, pain at the head of fibula, patellar pain, unable to flex the knee to 90 degrees, and inability to stand and walk at least four steps. If anterior cruciate ligament injury is suspected, radiographic imaging should also be ordered because it is frequently associated with lateral tibial plateau fracture. If there is a painful, reddish, and warm swelling in front of the patella, acute prepatellar bursitis should be considered which may require aspiration or drainage. Those presented with these features usually had history of frequent kneeling and direct trauma over the knee.

Pain, swelling, and a defect of the insertion of the quadriceps tendon into the superior part of the patella is suggestive of quadriceps tendon rupture. A "pop" sound may be associated with this injury, followed by the loss of the ability to straighten the knee (knee extension). Pain at the medial joint line (medial to the inferior border of the patella) indicates medial compartment osteoarthritis, injury to the medial collateral ligament, or a medial meniscal tear. Pain at the midpoint between the anterior part of the medial joint line and tibial tuberosity is suggestive of Pes anserine bursitis (inflammation of anserine bursa. Lateral joint line tenderness is associated with lateral compartment osteoarthritis, lateral collateral ligament injury, and lateral meniscal tear. Pain at the lateral femoral condyle is suggestive of iliotibial band syndrome. Swelling at the popliteal fossa may reveal a Baker's cyst.

== Motion ==
=== Assessment of effusion ===
The absence of normal grooves around patella may indicates a patellar intra-articular effusion. There are two ways to confirm the effusion. The knee is extended fully before the examination begins. This first way is the patellar tap. It is to squeeze the fluid between the patella and the femur by pressing at the medial patella using a non-dominant hand. Then, using the dominant hand to press on the patella vertically. If the patella is ballotable, then patellar intra-articular effusion is present. Another way is the milking of the patella. First, the effusion is milked at the medial border of the patella from inferior to superior aspect. Then, using another hand, the effusion is milked at the lateral border of the patella from superior to inferior aspect. If effusion is present, a bulge will be appear at the medial border of the patella because the effusion is milked back to the medial patella.

=== Assessment of range of motion ===
Both the active and passive range of motion should be assessed. The normal knee extension is between 0 and 10 degrees. The normal knee flexion is between 130 and 150 degrees. Any pain, abnormal movement, or crepitus of the patella should be noted. If there is pain or crepitus during active extension of the knee, while the patella is being compressed against the patellofemoral groove, patellofemoral pain syndrome or chondromalacia patellae should be suspected. Pain with active range of motion but no pain during passive range of motion is suggestive of inflammation of the tendon. Pain during active and passive range of motion is suggestive of pathology in the knee joint.

=== Assessment of collateral ligaments ===
Valgus stress test can be performed with the examined knee in 25 degrees flexion to determine the integrity of the medial collateral ligament. Similarly, varus stress test can be performed to access the integrity of the lateral collateral ligament. The degree of collateral ligament sprain can also be assessed during the valgus and varus tests. In a first degree tear, the ligament has less than 5 mm laxity with a definite resistance when the knee is pulled. In a second degree sprain, there is laxity when the knee is tested at 25 degrees of flexion, but no laxity at extension with a definite resistance when the knee is pulled. In a third degree tear, there will be 10 mm laxity with no definite resistance either with knee with full extension or flexion.

=== Assessment of anterior cruciate ligament ===
The anterior drawer and Lachman tests can be used to access the integrity of the anterior cruciate ligament. In the anterior drawer test, the person being examined should lie down on their back (supine position) with the knee in 90 degrees flexion. The foot is secured on the bed with the examiner sitting on the foot. The tibia is then pulled forward by using both hands. If the anterior movement of the affected knee is greater than the unaffected knee, then the anterior drawer test is positive. The Lachman test is more sensitive than the anterior drawer test. For the Lachman test, the person lies down in supine position with the knee flexed at 20 degrees and the heel touching the bed. The tibia is then pulled forward. If there is 6 to 8 millimeters of laxity, with no definitive resistance when the knee is pulled, then the test is positive thus raising concern for a torn anterior cruciate ligament. A large collection of blood in the knee can be associated with bony fractures and cruciate ligament tear.

=== Assessment of posterior cruciate ligament ===
Posterior drawer test and tibial sag tests can determine the integrity of the posterior cruciate ligament. Similar to anterior drawer test, the knee should be flexed 90 degrees and the tibia is pushed backwards. If the tibia can be pushed posteriorly, then the posterior drawer test is positive. In tibial sag test, both knees are flexed at 90 degrees with the person in supine position and bilateral feet touching the bed. Bilateral knees are then watch for posterior displacement of tibia. If the affected tibia slowly displaced posteriorly, the posterior cruciate ligament is affected.

=== Assessment of meniscus ===
Those with meniscal injuries may report symptoms such as clicking, catching, or locking of knees. Apart from joint line tenderness, there are three other methods of accessing meniscus tear: the McMurray test, the Thessaly test, and the Apley grind test. In McMurray test, the person should lie down in supine position with the knee should in 90 degrees flexion. the examiner put one hand with the thumb and the index finger on the medial and lateral joint lines respectively. Another hand is used to control the heel. To test the medial meniscus, the hand at the heel applies a valgus force and external rotates the leg while extending the knee. To test for the lateral meniscus, the varus force, internal rotation are applied to the leg while extending the knee. Any clicking, popping, or catching at the respective joint line indicates the corresponding meniscal tear.

In Apley compression test, the person lie down in prone position with the knee flexed at 90 degrees. One hand is used to stabilise the hip and another hand grasp the foot and apply a downward compression force while external and internal rotates the leg. Pain during compression indicates meniscal tear. Examination for anterior cruciate ligament tear should be done for those with meniscal tear because these two conditions often occurs together.

=== Additional Tests ===
- Clarke's test may be used to examine for patello-femoral pain
- The Wilson test is a test used to detect the presence of osteochondritis dissecans in the knee.

== See also ==
- Hip examination
- Knee effusion
- Knee osteoarthritis
- Knee pain
- Reflex hammer
