= Runner's knee =

Runner's knee may refer to a number of overuse injuries involving pain around the kneecap (patella), such as:

- Patellofemoral pain syndrome
- Chondromalacia patellae
- Iliotibial band syndrome
- Plica syndrome
