= Knee dislocation =

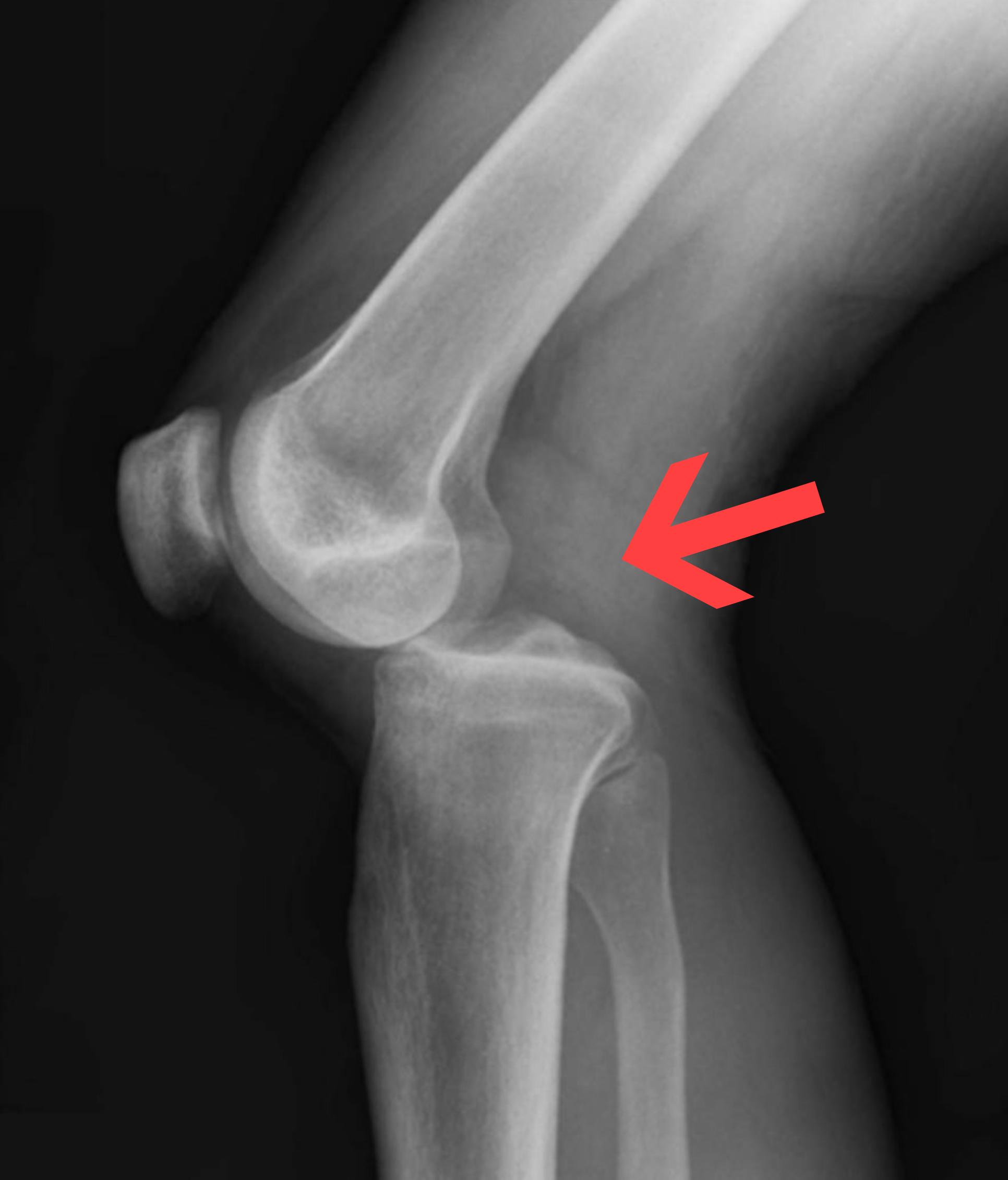
- Plain lateral X-ray of the left knee showing a posterior knee dislocation
- Specialty: Orthopedic surgery
- Symptoms: Knee pain, knee deformity
- Complications: Injury to the artery behind the knee, compartment syndrome
- Types: Anterior, posterior, lateral, medial, rotatory
- Causes: Trauma
- Diagnostic method: Based on history of the injury and physical examination, supported by medical imaging
- Differential diagnosis: Femur fracture, tibial fracture, patellar dislocation, ACL tear
- Treatment: Reduction, splinting, surgery
- Prognosis: 10% risk of amputation
- Frequency: 1 per 100,000 per year

A knee dislocation is an injury in which there is disruption of the knee joint between the tibia and the femur. Symptoms include pain and instability of the knee. Complications may include injury to an artery, most commonly the popliteal artery behind the knee, or compartment syndrome.

About half of cases are the result of major trauma and about half as a result of minor trauma. About 50% of the time, the joint spontaneously reduces before arrival at hospital. Typically there is a tear of the anterior cruciate ligament, posterior cruciate ligament, and either the medial collateral ligament or lateral collateral ligament. If the ankle–brachial pressure index is less than 0.9, CT angiography is recommended to detect blood vessel injury. Otherwise repeated physical exams may be sufficient. More recently, the FAST-D protocol, assessing the posterior tibial and dorsalis pedis arteries for a 'tri-phasic wave pattern' with ultrasound, has been shown to be reliable in ruling out significant arterial injury.

If the joint remains dislocated, reduction and splinting is indicated; this is typically carried out under procedural sedation. If signs of arterial injury are present, immediate surgery is generally recommended. Multiple surgeries may be required. In just over 10% of cases, an amputation of part of the leg is required.

Knee dislocations are rare, occurring in about 1 per 100,000 people per year. Males are more often affected than females. Younger adults are most often affected. Descriptions of this injury date back to at least 20 BC by Meges of Sidon.

== Signs and symptoms ==
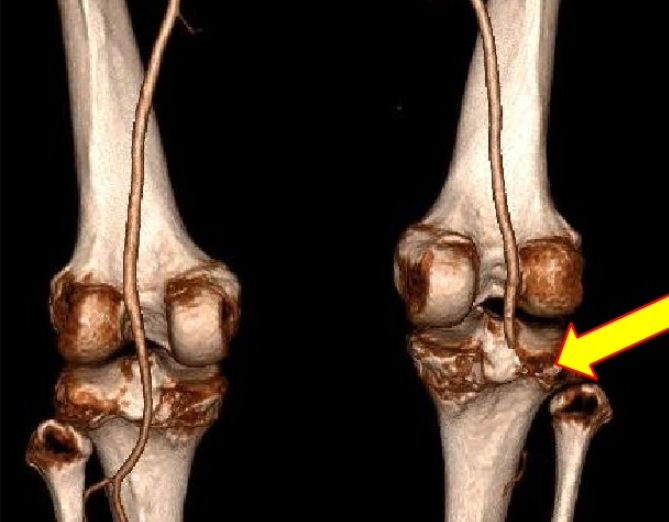
CT angiogram 3D reconstruction, posterior view showing a normal artery on the left, and occlusion to right popliteal artery as a result of a knee dislocation

Symptoms include knee pain. The joint may also have lost its normal shape and contour. A joint effusion may, or may not, be present.

=== Complications ===
Complications may include injury to the artery behind the knee (popliteal artery) in about 20% of cases or compartment syndrome. Damage to the common peroneal nerve or tibial nerve may also occur. Nerve problems, if they occur, often persist to a variable degree.

== Cause ==
About half are the result of major trauma, the other half as a result of minor trauma. Major trauma may include mechanisms such as falls from a significant height, motor vehicle collisions, or a pedestrian being hit by a motor vehicle. Cases due to major trauma often have other injuries.

Minor trauma may include tripping while walking or while playing sports. Risk factors include obesity.

The condition may also occur in a number of genetic disorders such as Ellis–van Creveld syndrome, Larsen syndrome, and Ehlers–Danlos syndrome.

== Diagnosis ==
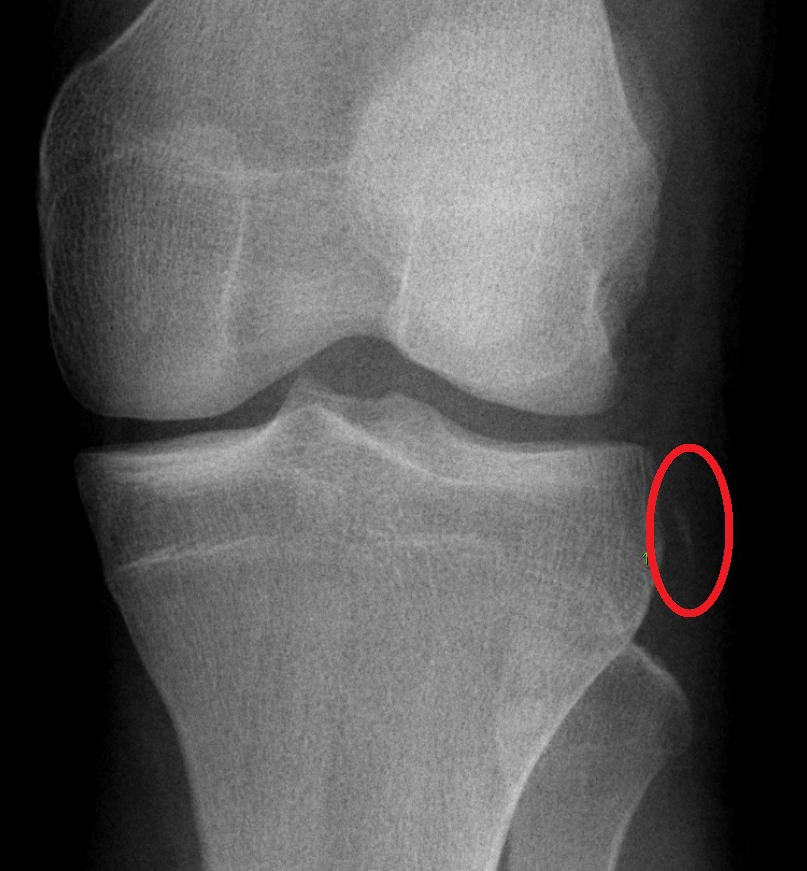
A Segond fracture seen on X-ray

As the injury may have self-reduced before arrival at hospital, the diagnosis may not be readily apparent. Diagnosis may be suspected based on the history of the injury and physical examination which may include anterior drawer test, valgus stress test, varus stress test, and posterior sag test. An accurate physical exam can be difficult due to pain.

Plain X-rays, CT scan, ultrasonography, or MRI may help with the diagnosis. Findings on X-ray that may be useful among those who have already reduced include a variable joint space, subluxation of the joint, or a Segond fracture.

If the ankle–brachial pressure index (ABI) is less than 0.9, CT angiography is recommended. Standard angiography may also be used. If the ABI is greater than 0.9 repeated physical exams over the next 24 hours to verify good blood flow may be sufficient. The ABI is calculated by taking the systolic blood pressure at the ankle and dividing it by the systolic blood pressure in the arm. More recently, the FAST-D protocol, using ultrasound to assess the posterior tibial and dorsalis pedis arteries for a 'tri-phasic wave pattern', has been shown to be reliable in ruling out significant arterial injury.

=== Classification ===
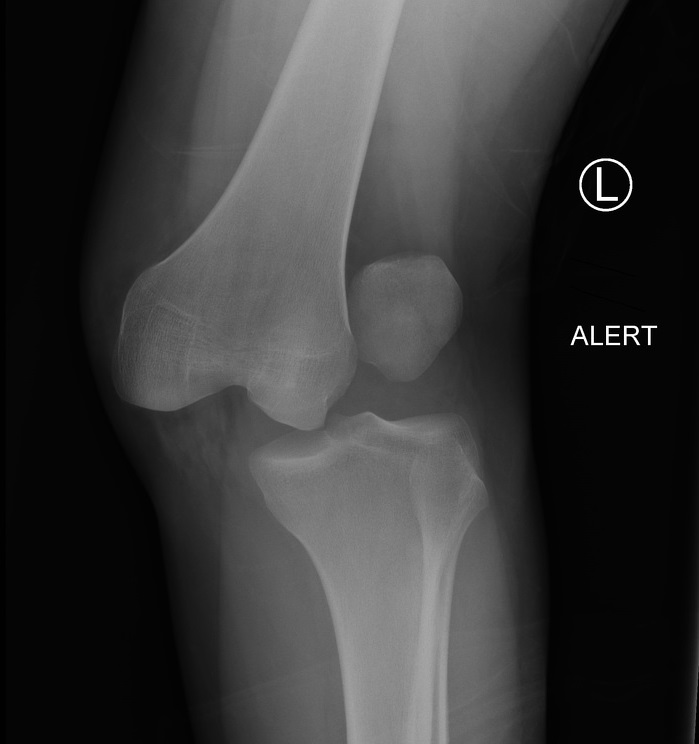
A lateral dislocation of the knee

They may be divided into five types: anterior, posterior, lateral, medial, and rotatory. This classification is based on the movement of the tibia with respect to the femur. Anterior dislocations, followed by posterior, are the most common. They may also be classified on the basis of which ligaments are injured.

== Treatment ==
Initial management is often based on Advanced Trauma Life Support. If the joint remains dislocated reduction and splinting is indicated. Reduction can often be done with simple traction after the person has received procedural sedation. If the joint cannot be reduced in the emergency department, then emergency surgery is recommended.

In those with signs of arterial injury, immediate surgery is generally carried out. If the joint does not stay reduced external fixation may be needed. If the nerves and artery are intact the ligaments may be repaired after a few days. Multiple surgeries may be required. In just over 10% of cases an amputation of part of the leg is required.

== Epidemiology ==
Knee dislocations are rare: they represent about 1 in 5,000 orthopedic injuries, and about 1 knee dislocation occurs annually per 100,000 people. Males are more often affected than females, and young adults the most often.
