= Hip examination =

Health related procedure

In medicine, physiotherapy, chiropractic, and osteopathy the hip examination, or hip exam, is undertaken when a patient has a complaint of hip pain and/or signs and/or symptoms suggestive of hip joint pathology. It is a physical examination maneuver.

== Examination steps ==
The hip examination, like all examinations of the joints, is typically divided into the following sections:

- Position/lighting/draping
- Inspection
- Palpation
- Motion
- Special maneuvers

The middle three steps are often remembered with the saying look, feel, move.

== Position/lighting/draping ==
Position – for most of the exam the patient should be supine and the bed or examination table should be flat. The patient's hands should remain at their sides with the head resting on a pillow. The knees and hips should be in the anatomical position (knee extended, hip neither flexed nor extended).

Lighting – adjusted so that it is ideal.

Draping – both of the patient's hips should be exposed so that the quadriceps muscles and greater trochanter can be assessed.

== Inspection ==
=== Inspection done while the patient is standing ===
Look

Front and back of pelvis/hips and legs and comment on

1. Ischaemic or trophic changes·
2. Level of ASIS (anterior superior iliac spine)
3. Swelling (soft tissue, bony swellings)
4. Scars (old injuries, previous surgery)
5. Sinuses (infection, neuropathic ulcers)
6. Wasting (old polio, Carcot-Marie-Tooth) or hypertrophy (e.g. calf pseudohypertrophy in muscular dystrophy)
7. Deformity (leg length discrepancy, pes cavus, scoliosis, lordosis, khyphosis)

Feel

1. Any swellings·Anteriorly in scarpas triangle, Trochanteric region or gluteal region
2. Pelvic tilt by palpating level of ASIS (anterior superior illiac spine)

Move·

Gait: Observe

1. Smooth and progression of phases of gait cycle
2. Comment on stance, toe-off, swing heel strike, stride and step length
3. Sufficient flexion/extension at hip/knee ankle and foot:
4. Any fixed contractures?
5. Arm-swing and balance on turning around·

Abnormal Gait Patterns

1. Trendelenburg (pelvic sway/tilt, a.k.a. waddling gait if bilateral)
2. Broad-based (ataxia)
3. High-stepping (loss of proprioception/drop foot)
4. Antalgic (mention “with reduced stance phase on left/right side”)
5. In-toeing (persistent femoral anteversion)

=== Inspection done while supine ===
The hip should be examined for:

- Masses
- Scars
- Lesions
- Signs of trauma/previous surgery
- Bony alignment (rotation, leg length)
- Muscle bulk and symmetry at the hip and knee

==== Measures ====
- True leg length – Greater Trochanter of the femur or Anterior Superior Iliac Spine of pelvis to medial malleolus of ipsilateral leg.
- Apparent leg length – umbilicus or xiphisternum (noting which is used) to the medial malleolus of ipsilateral leg.

In hip fractures the affected leg is often shortened and externally rotated.

== Palpation ==
The hip joint lies deep inside the body and cannot normally be directly palpated.

To assess for pelvic fracture one should palpate the:

- Iliac spines
- Superior and inferior pubic rami

== Movement ==
- Internal rotation – with knee and hip both flexed at 90 degrees the ankle is abducted.
- External rotation – with knee and hip both flexed at 90 degrees the ankle is adducted. (also done with the Patrick's test / FABER test)
- Flexion (also known as the Gaenslen's test)
- Extension – done with the patient on their side. Alignment should be assessed by palpation of the ASIS, PSIS and greater trochanter.
- Abduction – assessed whilst palpating the contralateral ASIS.
- Adduction – assessed whilst palpating the ipsilateral ASIS.
- Assessment for a hidden flexion contracture of the hip – hip flexion contractures may be occult, due to compensation by the back. They are assessed by:
  1. Placing a hand behind the lumbar region of back
  2. Getting the patient to fully flex the contralateral hip.
  3. The hand in the lumbar region is used to confirm the back is straightened (flexed relative to the anatomic position). If there is a flexion contracture in the ipsilateral hip it should be evident, as the hip will appear flexed.

=== Normal range of motion ===
- Internal rotation – 40°
- External rotation – 45°
- Flexion – 125°
- Extension – 10–40°
- Abduction – 45°
- Adduction – 30°

== Special maneuvers ==
- Trendelenburg test/sign:
1. Make sure pelvis is horizontal by palpating ASIS.
2. Ask patient to stand on one leg and then on the other.
3. Assess any pelvic tilt by keeping an index finger on each ASIS.
4. Normal (Trendelenburg negative): In the one-legged stance, the unsupported side of the pelvis remains at the same level as the side the patient is standing or even rise a little, because of powerful contraction of hip abductors on the stance leg.
5. Abnormal (Trendelenburg positive): In the one-legged stance, the unsupported side of the pelvis drops below the level as the side the patient isstanding on. This is because of (abnormal) weakness of hip abductors on the stance leg. The latter hip joint may therefore be abnormal.
6. Assisted Trendlenburg test If balance is a problem, face the patient and ask them to place their hands on yours to support him/her as he/she does alternate one-legged stance. Increased asymmetrical pressure on one hand indicates a positive Trendelenburg test, on the side of the abnormal hip
7. A ‘delayed’ Trendelenburg has also been described, where the pelvic tilt appears after a minute or so: this indicates abnormal fatiguability of the hip abductors.

Romberg's test This assesses proprioception/balance (dorsal columns of spinal cord/spino-cerebellarpathways).

1. Ask the patient to stand with heels together and hands by the side. Ask the patient to close his/her eyes and observe for swaying for about 10seconds.
2. Most people sway a bit but then quickly decrease the amplitude of swaying. If however, the swaying is not corrected, or the patient opens the eyes or takes a step to regain balance, Romberg's test is positive.
3. When doing this test, stand facing the patient with your arms outstretched and hands are at the level of the patient's shoulders to catch or stabilise him/her in case of a positive Romberg's test.
- Ober's test for tight ITB (IlioTibial Band, also called IlioTibial Tract) performed with patient side lying on unaffected side and the provider extending the affected hip. Stabilize the pelvis and let the affected leg drop. A positive test is indicated if the leg does not adduct to the table.
- Thomas test for tight hip flexors both performed by the provider holding the unaffected leg to the chest and leaving the affected leg on the table. If the affected leg cannot lie flat on the table it is a positive test.
- the Kendall test is similar, but the patient holds the unaffected leg to their chest.
- Rectus Femoris Contracture test for tight rectus femoris performed like Thomas test, but with the affected leg bent off the end of a table. a positive test is indicated if the thigh is not parallel with the table.

Kaltenborn test or Hip Lag Sign for hip abductor function. To perform the Kaltenborn test, the patient has to lie in a lateral, neutral position with the affected leg being on top. The examiner then positions one arm under this leg to have good hold and control over the relaxed extremity, whereas the other hand stabilizes the pelvis. The next step is to passively extend to 10° in the hip, abduct to 20° and rotate internally as far as possible, while the knee remains in a flexed position of 45°. After the patient is asked to hold the leg actively in this position, the examiner releases the leg. The Hip Lag Sign is considered positive if the patient is not able to keep the leg in the aforementioned abducted, internally rotated position and the foot drops more than 10 cm. To ensure an accurate result, the test should be repeated three times.

== Other tests ==
A knee examination should be undertaken in the ipsilateral knee to rule-out knee pathology.

== See also ==
- Anatomical terms of location
- Anatomical terms of motion
