= Patellofemoral =

Patellofemoral (sometimes femoropatellar) refers to relations between the patella and the femur, such as:

- Knee, including the "Patellofemoral joint"
- Patellofemoral pain syndrome
- Medial collateral ligament - the "Medial patellofemoral ligament"
