= Clarke's test =

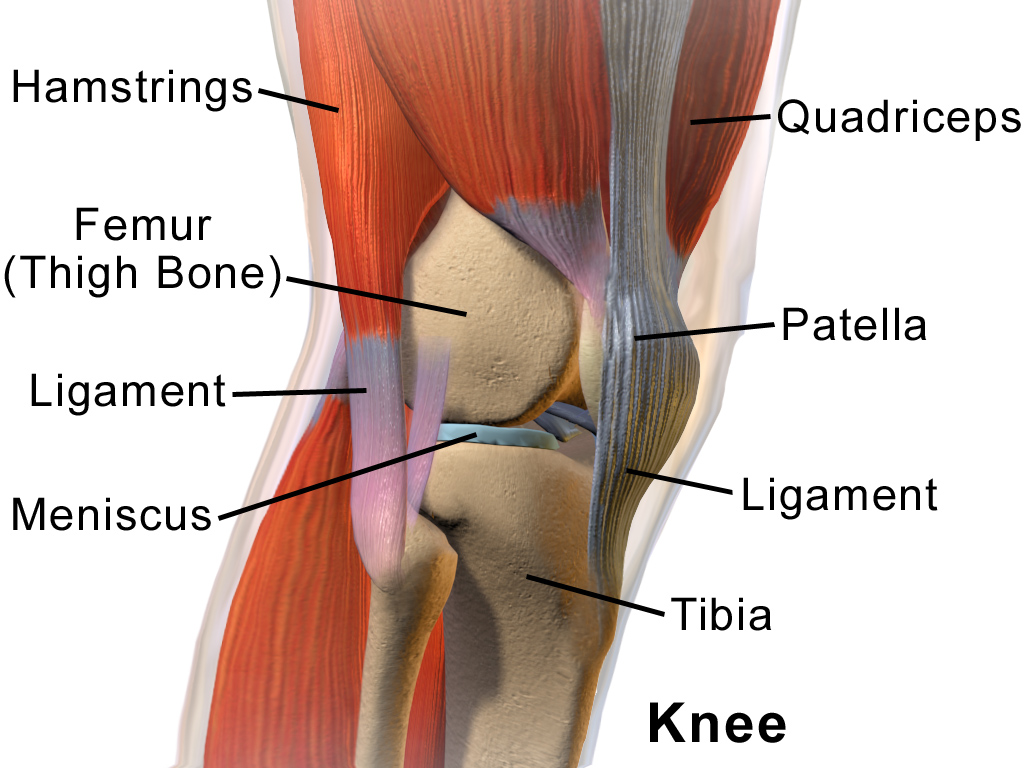
- Purpose: Test for patellofemoral pain syndrome, chondromalacia patellae or patellofemoral arthritis

In medicine, Clarke's test (also known as the Osmond-Clarke test or patellar grind test) is a component of knee examination which may be used to test for patellofemoral pain syndrome, chondromalacia patellae, patellofemoral arthritis, or anterior knee pain. It is not a standard part of the knee examination but is used to diagnose anterior knee pain where the history indicates this as the likely pathology. The patient is asked to actively contract the quadriceps muscle while the examiner's hand exerts pressure on the superior pole of the patella, so trying to prevent the proximal movement of the patella. While it can produce some discomfort even in normal people, the reproduction of the symptoms suggest pain of patellofemoral origin.

Evidence for the validity of Clarke's test is limited and some sources claim the test is not clinically useful, though it remains prevalent in clinical practice.

== See also ==
- Knee examination
