= Infrapatellar fat pad syndrome =

- Other names: Hoffa's disease
- Cross section of the human knee
- Specialty: Orthopedics, sports medicine
- Symptoms: Pain in the front of the knee
- Causes: Trauma, surgery
- Differential diagnosis: Patellar tendinopathy, infrapatellar bursitis
- Treatment: Steroid injections, physical therapy, surgery
- Frequency: Relatively common (athletes)

Infrapatellar fat pad syndrome, also known as Hoffa's disease, is when pain in the front of the knee occurs due to problems with the infrapatellar fat pad. Pain is generally just below the kneecap. Symptoms may worsen if the knee is overly straightened or bent for too long a period. Complications may include an inability to fully straighten the knee.

The underlying mechanism may involve bleeding, inflammation, or insufficient space for the fat pad. This may occur as a result of trauma or surgery to the knee. Diagnosis may be supported by magnetic resonance imaging (MRI).

Treatment is generally by steroid injections and physical therapy. If this is not effective surgery removal may be tried. While overall it is an uncommon condition, it is relatively common in athletes.

== Treatment ==
Treatment is generally by steroid injections and physical therapy. If this is not effective surgery removal may be tried. High quality evidence for surgery is lacking as of 2015.
