= Common injuries in cricket =

Overview of some of the more frequent types of injuries in cricket

The most common injuries in the sport of cricket occur in the lower back, thighs, shoulders, and hands. They can be classified as direct injuries or indirect injuries. Direct injuries are due to impact with the cricket ball, bat, or ground. Indirect injuries occur mostly due to repetitive movement causing overuse of muscles. Fast bowlers have the highest injury prevalence rate followed by batsmen.

== Upper limb injuries ==
=== Shoulder ===
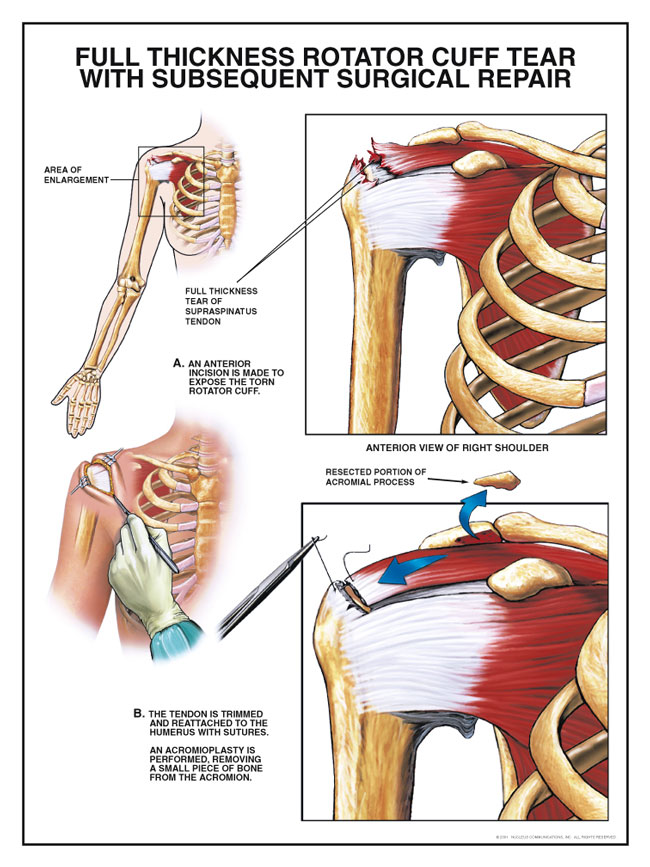
Rotator cuff tear surgical repair procedure

Shoulder injuries to cricketers are most often a result of fielding, and occasionally bowling. Overuse of the shoulder when throwing repeatedly during fielding in a cricket game can lead to problems such as tendinitis in the biceps, a tear of the supraspinatus tendon, or even degenerative changes to the rotator cuff which could result in surgery to fix the tear. Impingement, a syndrome that occurs when the rotator cuff muscles are inflamed or irritated, is a major injury risk that can develop amongst bowlers. A 2001–2002 study focused on identifying a workload threshold that would avoid an increased risk of shoulder injuries. The study found that bowlers who produced an average of 123–188 deliveries per week were less likely to face injury whereas bowlers who averaged below 123 deliveries or above 188 deliveries per week were at a greater risk of causing injury.

=== Elbow ===
Injuries to the elbow are a result of repetitive use and occasionally poor techniques when both batting and bowling. Having a poor technique causes excess strain on the joint resulting in inflammation of the tendons surrounding the elbow. The inflammation can be treated through physiotherapy and rehabilitation to reduce the inflammation and strengthen the imbalance in the forearm.

=== Hand ===
The majority of injuries sustained to the hands and wrists of a cricketer are impact injuries from the contact of the ball causing fractures, dislocations, and sprains. Wicket keepers are particularly prone to hand injuries. Injuries to the fingers are the most common regarding the hand. Injured fingers are often splinted and compressed to reduce swelling around the joint. Physiotherapy is essential to ensure the stiffness of the joint does not become too severe so that movement at the joint returns to normal.

== Back injuries ==
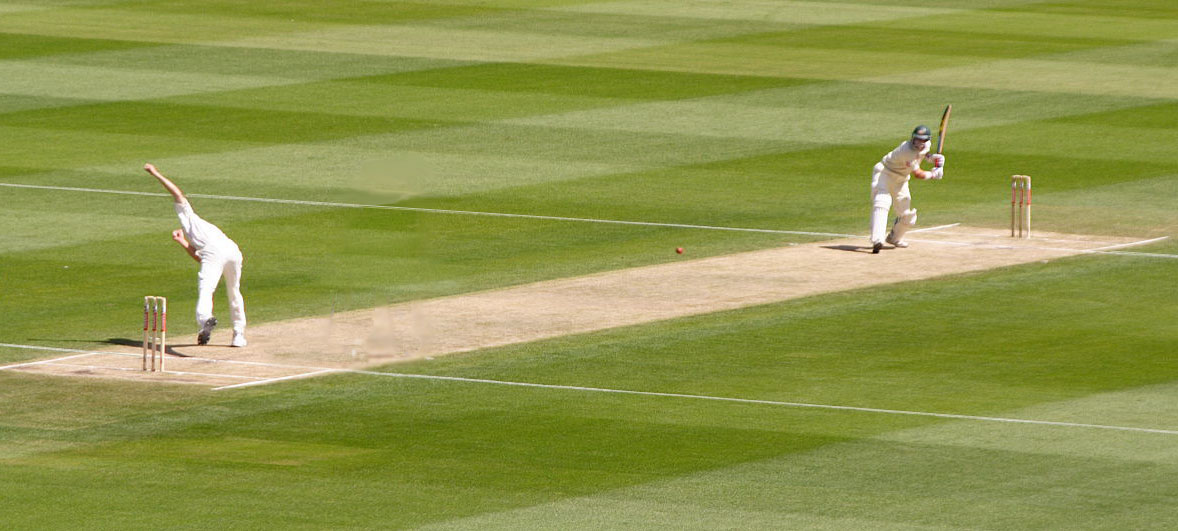
Bowling action causing stress on lower back

The most common injury location for most cricketers, specifically bowlers, is the back. According to Stretch (1995), 33.3% of schoolboys and 17% of A-grade players suffer from back injuries. A 1984 study in the Journal of Human Movement Studies compared international bowlers who had a side-on action and those who had a front-on action to determine which was a better option regarding the players back. They concluded that "an inability to achieve a side-on orientation during the delivery stride was the main cause of back injuries". One of the most common problems that young bowlers face is pain in the lower back. Performing a bowling action continuously for long periods of time can place excess stress on the lower back muscle tissue, which can then lead to serious stress fractures of the vertebra. These stress fractures can lead to a significant amount of time out of the game.

== Lower limb injuries ==
=== Knee ===
The most common knee injuries associated with cricket occur when a player is bowling. In the landing stride, bowlers are constantly twisting and putting extreme force through the knee joint, which can result in a strain or even a tear to the collateral ligaments. Patellar tendinopathy frequently occurs in bowlers due to overuse of the tendon, and can lead to the tendon fibres beginning to break down. David Lawrence, an English fast bowler is one particular example of how the landing stride when bowling can cause serious injuries to the knee: on 10 February 1992, his left patella shattered during a delivery.

=== Foot and ankle ===
Epidemiological studies looking at the most common injuries that affect fast bowlers found that 11% of injuries involve the foot and the ankle. The majority of the injuries to the feet and ankles of fast bowlers are a result of the impact of the foot planted in the delivery stride. As bowlers plantar flex their ankles in the delivery stride, this can cause posterior impingement. After a long duration this plantar flexion can lead to the creation of a bone spur which can then be treated through surgery.

== See also ==
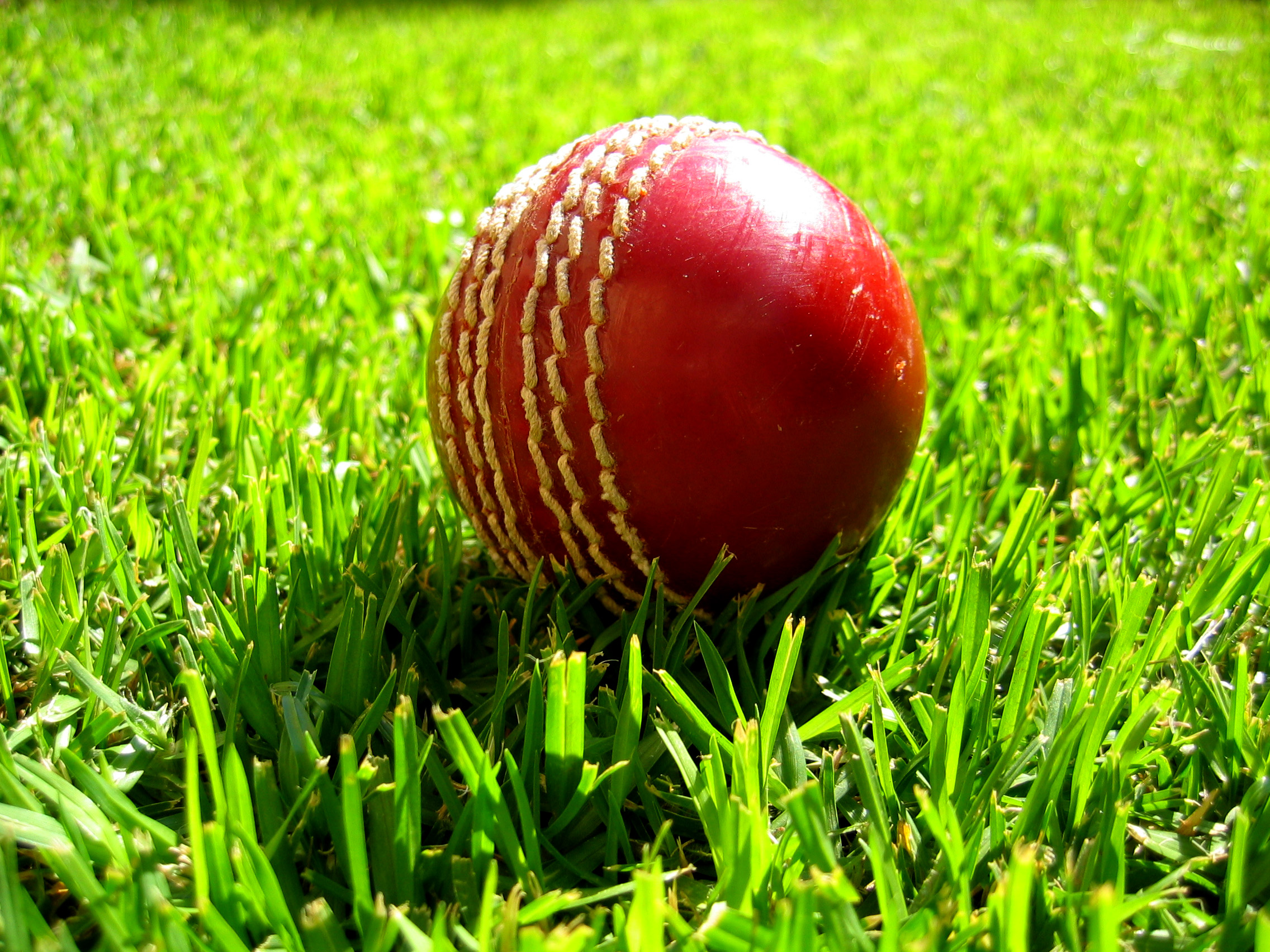
Cricket ball

- Cricket ball
- Sports injury
- Cricket
- Tendinitis
- Patellar tendinitis
