= Knee taping =

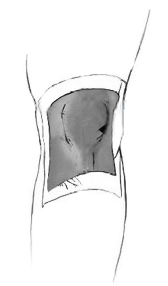
- Knee taping
- Specialty: Orthopedic

Knee taping (also known as patellar taping) is a procedure performed by physiotherapists or physicians to alleviate the symptoms of patellofemoral pain. Though knee taping has been shown to offer short-term pain relief, its long-term efficacy is confounded by several studies. The mechanism of action by which it alleviates pain is unknown, though it has been suggested by physicians that it could correct patella position, facilitate/inhibit quadriceps components or bear stress associated with peripatellar tissues or patellar compression (Wilson, T). Evidence for these suggestions, however, has been contradictory or absent.

== Types of tape ==
A pre-wrap is a protective tape. Its purpose is to create a firm surface for further taping.

Adhesive tape or wrap is applied to the cover tape and must not be applied directly to the skin.
