= Gaenslen's test =

- Synonyms: Gaenslen's maneuver
- Purpose: detect musculoskeletal abnormalities

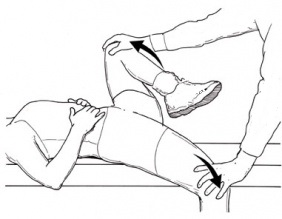
Gaenslen's test for the sacroiliac joint

Gaenslen's test, also known as Gaenslen's maneuver, is a medical test used to detect musculoskeletal abnormalities and primary-chronic inflammation of the lumbar vertebrae and sacroiliac joint. This test is often used to test for spondyloarthritis, sciatica, or other forms of rheumatism, and is often performed during checkup visits in patients who have been diagnosed with one of the former disorders. It is named after Frederick Julius Gaenslen, the orthopedic surgeon who invented the test. This test is often performed alongside Patrick's test and Yeoman's test.

To perform Gaenslen's test, the hip joint is flexed maximally on one side and the opposite hip joint is extended, stressing both sacroiliac joints simultaneously. This is often done by having the patient lying on their back, lifting the knee to push towards the patient's chest while the other leg is allowed to fall over the side of an examination table, and is pushed toward the floor, flexing both sacroiliac joints. The test can also be performed with the patient in the lateral recumbent position. The patient lies with the involved side up and passively flexes the uninvolved hip as far as comfortable to their chest. The involved hip is taken into extension while stability is maintained in the pelvis. The test is considered positive if the patient experiences pain while this test is performed, and may indicate a need for further testing, such as an X-ray or lumbar CT scan.
