= Gerdy's tubercle =

Lateral tubercle of the tibia

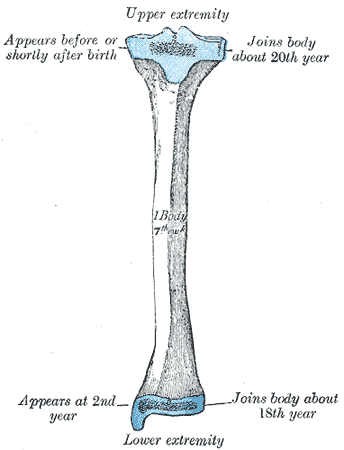
- Gerdy's tubercle is located on the lateral condyle of the tibia

Details

Identifiers
- Latin: tuberculum anterolaterale
- TA2: 1411

Gerdy's tubercle or anterolateral tibial tubercle, is a lateral tubercle of the tibia, located where the iliotibial tract inserts. It was named after French surgeon Pierre Nicolas Gerdy (1797–1856).

Gerdy's tubercle is a smooth facet on the lateral aspect of the upper part of the tibia, just below the knee joint and adjacent to the proximal tibio-fibular joint, where the iliotibial tract runs down the outside part of the thigh. It is the point of insertion for the iliotibial band of the lateral thigh.

It is used as a site for the insertion of a periosteal needle by which intraosseous infusion may be administered in neonates. It can be fractured along with the tibial tuberosity. It has been used as a source for bone grafts.

The peroneal nerve runs near to it.
