= Patellar tendon rupture =

Tear of the tendon connecting the kneecap (patella) and shinbone (tibia)

- Other names: Patellar tendon tear
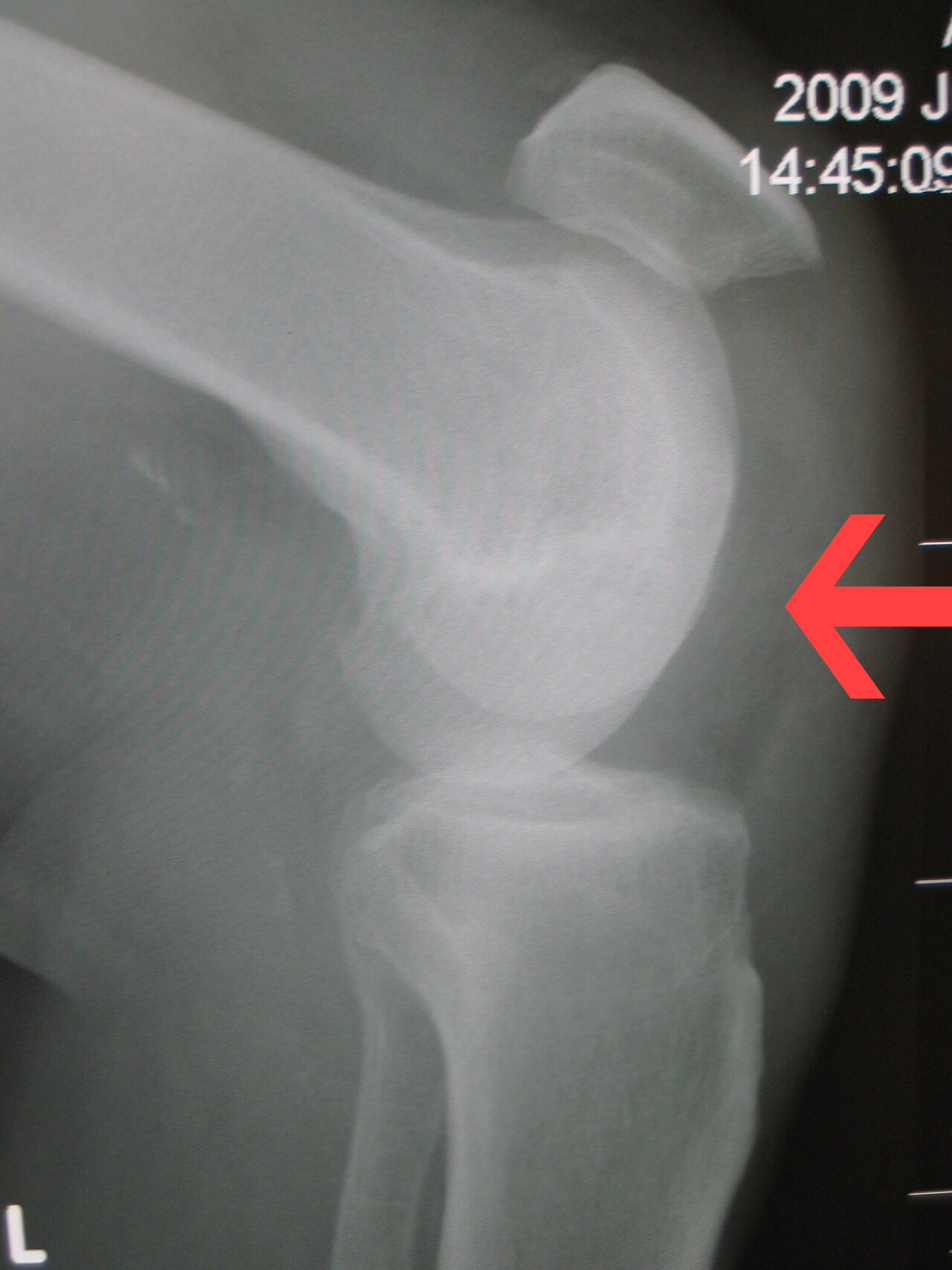
- Patellar tendon rupture showing a marked distance between the tibial tuberosity and the bottom of the knee cap.
- Specialty: Orthopedics
- Symptoms: Pain, trouble walking, inability to straighten the knee
- Usual onset: Sudden
- Types: Partial, complete
- Causes: Falling directly on the knee, jumping from a height
- Risk factors: Patellar tendinitis, kidney failure, diabetes, steroid use
- Diagnostic method: Based on symptoms, examination, medical imaging
- Differential diagnosis: Patellar fracture, patella dislocation, quadriceps tendon rupture, muscle strain
- Treatment: Rest, physiotherapy, surgery
- Prognosis: Good
- Frequency: Up to 1 in 10,000 per year

Patellar tendon rupture is a tear of the tendon that connects the knee cap (patella) to the tibia. Often there is sudden onset of pain and walking is difficult. In a complete rupture, the ability to extend that knee is decreased. A pop may be felt when it occurs.

Injury to the patellar tendon generally requires a significant force such as falling directly on the knee or jumping from a height. Risk factors include patellar tendinitis, kidney failure, diabetes, and steroid or fluoroquinolone use. There are two main types of ruptures: partial and complete. In most cases, the patellar tendon tears at the point where it attaches to the knee cap. Diagnosis is based on symptoms, examination, and medical imaging.

Small tears may be treated with rest and splinting, followed by physiotherapy. Larger tears typically require surgery within a couple of weeks. Outcomes are generally good. Rates in the general population are not clear; however, in certain high-risk groups it occurs about 1 in 10,000 per year. They occur most often in those under the age of 40.

== Signs and symptoms ==
The sign of a ruptured patella tendon is the movement of the patella further up the quadriceps. When rupture occurs, the patella loses support from the tibia and moves toward the hip when the quadriceps muscle contracts, hindering the leg's ability to extend. This means that those affected cannot stand, as their knee buckles and gives way when they attempt to do so.

== Mechanism ==
The upper part of the patellar tendon attaches on the lower part of the knee cap, and the lower part of the patella tendon attaches to the tibial tubercle on the front of the tibia. Above the knee cap, the quadriceps muscle via the quadriceps tendon attaches to the top of the knee cap. This structure allows the knee to flex and extend, allowing use of basic functions such as walking and running.

== Diagnosis ==
Patellar tendon rupture can usually be diagnosed by physical examination. The most common signs are: tenderness, the tendon's loss of tone, loss of ability to raise the straight leg and observation of the high-riding patella. Radiographically, patella alta can be detected using the Insall and Salvati method when the patella is shorter than its tendon. Partial tears may be visualized using MRI scans.

== Treatment ==
Patellar tendon rupture must be treated surgically. With a tourniquet applied, the tendon is exposed through a midline longitudinal incision extending from the upper patellar pole to the tibial tuberosity. The tendon is either avulsed (detached) from the lower patellar pole or lacerated. Even so, the continuity and tone of the tendon should be restored, taking into consideration the patellar height.

A cast or brace is then put over where the operation took place. The cast or brace remains for at least 6 weeks, followed by a variable time of rehabilitation of the knee typically ranging from 6 to 12 months. The usual risks of surgery are involved, including infection, stiffness, death, suture reaction, failure of satisfactory healing, risks of anesthesia, phlebitis, pulmonary embolus, and persistent pain or weakness after the injury and repair.

If the tendon rupture is a partial tear (without the two parts of the tendon being separated), then non-surgical methods of treatment may suffice. The future of non-surgical care for partial patella tendon ruptures is likely bioengineering. Ligament reconstruction is possible using mesenchymal stem cells and a silk scaffold. These same stem cells have been shown to be capable of seeding repair of damaged animal tendons. In 2010, a clinical study proved that mechanical loading of the tendon callus during the remodeling phase leads to healing by regeneration.
