= Discoid meniscus =

Human anatomic variant affecting the lateral meniscus of the knee

Discoid lateral meniscus

Discoid meniscus is a rare human anatomic variant that usually affects the lateral meniscus of the knee. Usually a person with this anomaly has no complaints; however, it may present as pain, swelling, or a snapping sound heard from the affected knee. Strong suggestive findings on magnetic resonance imaging includes a thickened meniscal body seen on more than two contiguous sagittal slices.

== Description ==
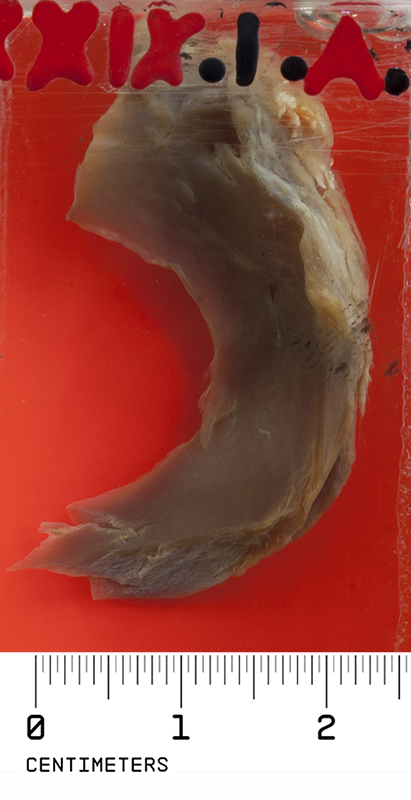
Photograph of a congenital discoid menisci specimen from the University of Cape Town Pathology Learning Centre teaching collection.

The Watanabe classification of discoid lateral meniscus is: (A) Incomplete, (B) Complete, and (C) Wrisberg-ligament variant

Normally, the meniscus is a thin crescent-shaped piece of cartilage that lies between the weight bearing joint surfaces of the femur and the tibia. It is attached to the lining of the knee joint along its periphery and serves to absorb about a third of the impact load that the joint cartilage surface sees and also provides some degree of stabilization for the knee. There are two menisci in the knee joint, with one on the outside (away from midline) being the lateral meniscus and the inner one (towards midline) the medial meniscus. A discoid meniscus is a congenital anomaly of the knee found in 3% of the population (up to 15% in Asia). It typically affects the lateral meniscus and may be found bilaterally (20%). Instead of the narrow crescent shape, as seen in a normal meniscus above, a discoid meniscus is thickened, and has a fuller crescent shape. In addition, a discoid meniscus does not taper as much towards the center of the joint and is shaped like a disc. The thickness of the meniscus, its diminished vascular blood supply, and in some instances, weak capsular attachment, makes it more prone to tears compared to a normal meniscus. The anomaly in itself is asymptomatic; however, a tear of the meniscus can result in pain, swelling, and snapping in the affected knee. The orthopedic classification of discoid menisci includes: complete, incomplete or Wrisberg-ligament types as depicted here. Coverage of the lateral tibial plateau determines the designation of complete or incomplete. The Wrisberg-ligament type has an abnormal posterior attachment by attaching to part of the posterior cruciate ligament.

== Symptoms ==
Symptom is usually pain in the knee. And when the knee is bent or stretched it makes the sound of bouncing bones.

== Diagnosis ==
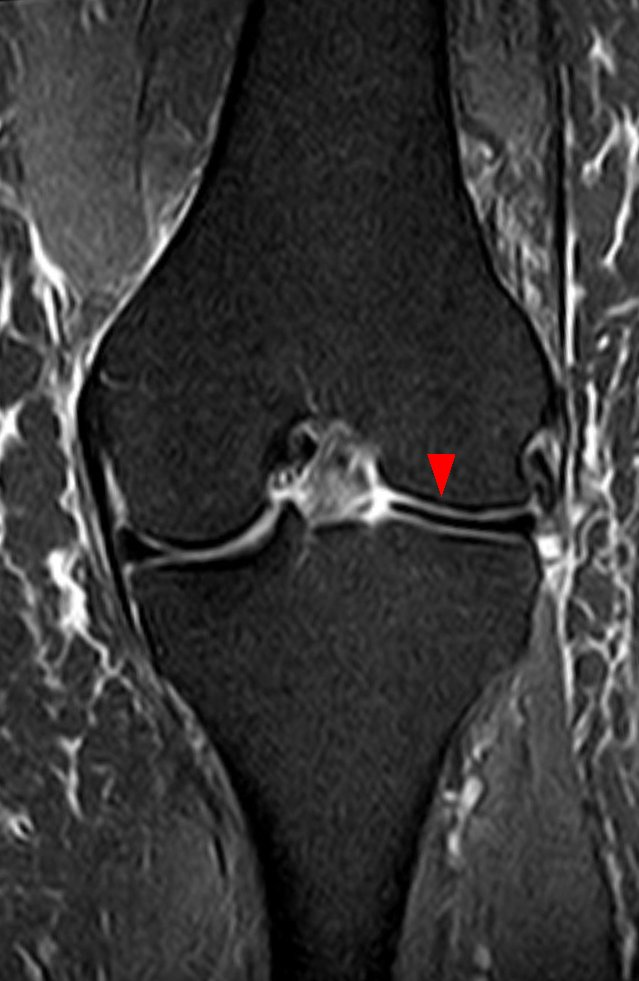
Discoid meniscus on coronal proton-density weighted MRI

The transverse diameter of a normal meniscus is approximately 10 to 11 mm; therefore a normal meniscus body will be visible on only 2 slices of a MR with 4-5-mm sagittal slices. A discoid meniscus should be considered if more than two contiguous body segments are present. However, this method may lead to a false negative when evaluating people with the Wrisberg variant of discoid meniscus since it maintains a narrow crescent shape. Coronal and radial images of the meniscus are useful to demonstrate the extension of the aberrant meniscus into the joint as seen here. On coronal images, it is diagnosed when the horizontal measurement between the free margin and the periphery of the body is more than 1.4 cm. Rarely, X-ray may show lateral joint space widening, squaring of the lateral condyle, cupping of the lateral tibial plateau and hypoplasia of the lateral tibial spine that suggest discoid meniscus.

=== Treatment ===
In a patient complaining of acute onset knee pain, an X-ray study would be done to rule out any bony pathology such as a fracture. Since it is difficult to diagnose meniscal anomalies with X-ray, an MRI would be necessary to visualize the discoid meniscus. If the patient is asymptomatic and does not complain of significant locking sensation in the knee or pain, treatment is conservative and consists of stretching and strengthening exercises for the quadriceps and hamstring muscles. “In cases where there is significant disability, surgical excision may be needed. When the discoid meniscus is severely damaged, total excision of the meniscus may be necessary. In most cases where the meniscus is still generally intact, a partial excision to preserve the cushioning function may be sufficient.”

== See also ==
- Knee pain
- Knee osteoarthritis
- Meniscal cyst
