= Precordial catch syndrome =

- Other names: Texidor's twinge
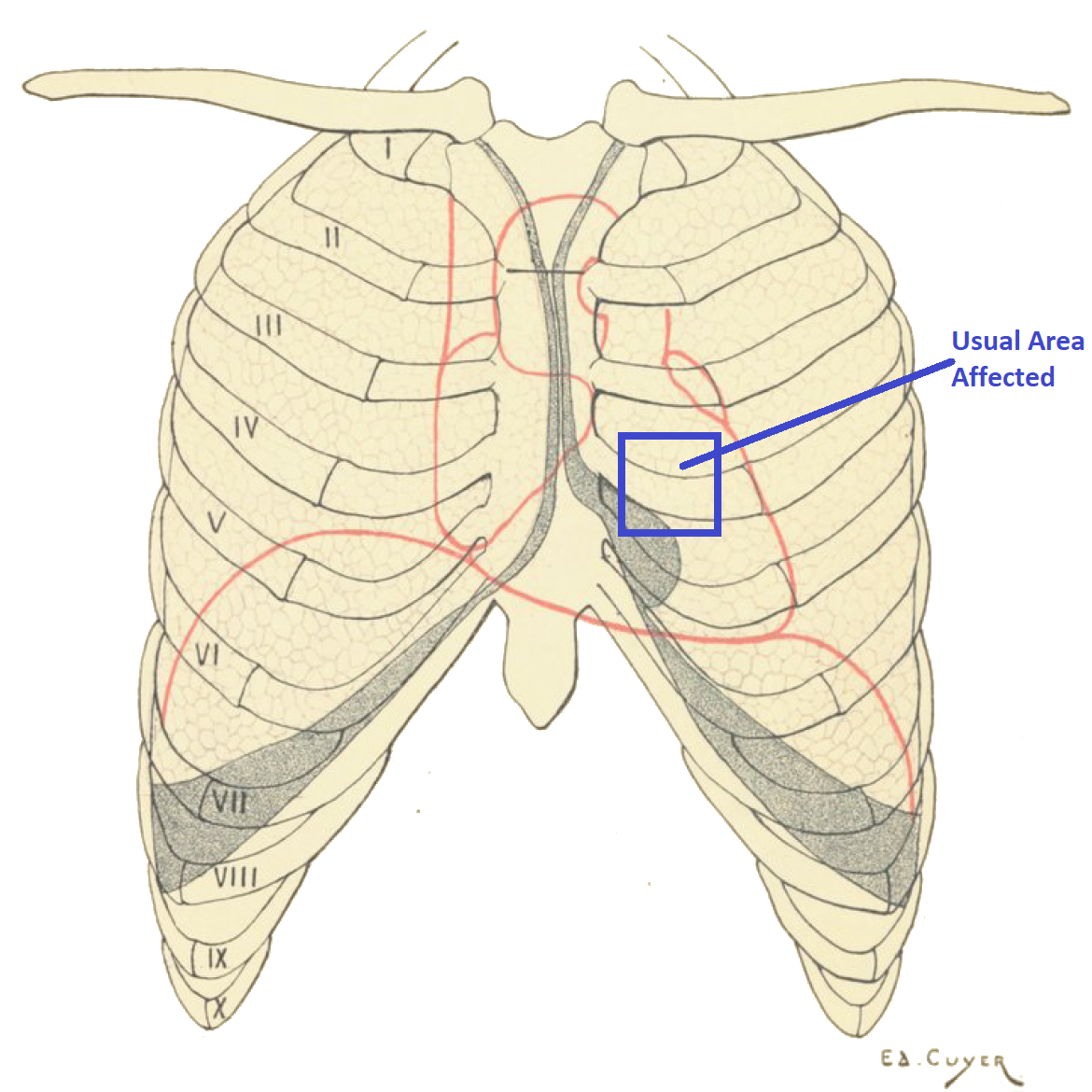
- One of the areas more commonly affected in precordial catch syndrome
- Specialty: Pediatrics, family medicine
- Symptoms: Sharp, stabbing chest pain in a small area
- Usual onset: Sudden
- Duration: 30 seconds to 3 minutes
- Causes: Unclear
- Differential diagnosis: Angina, pericarditis, pleurisy, chest trauma
- Treatment: Reassurance
- Prognosis: Good
- Frequency: Relatively common

Precordial catch syndrome (PCS) is a non-serious condition in which there are sharp stabbing pains in the chest. These typically get worse with inhaling and occur within a small area. Spells of pain usually last less than a few minutes. Typically it begins at rest and other symptoms are absent. Concerns about the condition may result in anxiety.

Precordial catch syndrome is relatively common, and children between the ages of 6 and 12 are most commonly affected. Males and females are affected equally. It is less common in adults. The condition has been described since at least 1893.

== Signs and symptoms ==
Characteristic symptoms include sharp stabbing pains in the chest. These typically get worse with breathing in and occur within a small area. Spells of pain usually last less than a few minutes. Typically it begins at rest and other symptoms are absent. Concerns about the condition may result in anxiety, with sufferers often fearing that the pain is a sign of a more serious condition. Similar anxieties in those who experience the syndrome on a regular basis may manifest as a worry of the syndrome itself happening, with patients feeling scared to take fuller breaths in fear of triggering a spell. Other conditions that may produce similar symptoms include angina, pericarditis, pleurisy, and chest trauma.

== Causes ==
The underlying cause is unclear. Some believe the pain may be from the chest wall or irritation of an intercostal nerve. Psychological stress is correlated with precordial catch syndrome. The pain is not due to the heart.

== Treatment ==
Treatment is typically reassurance, as the pain generally resolves without any specific treatment. Occasionally it goes away after a couple of breaths, but inhaling quickly may worsen pain.

The pain is agitated by expansion and contraction of the chest. Taking a deep breath and allowing the rib cage to fully expand can relieve the pain, however it will feel unpleasant initially. At the point of full expansion, it can feel like a rubber band snap in the chest, after which the initial pain subsides.

There is no known cure for PCS; however, PCS is not believed to be dangerous or life-threatening. Many see the worst part about PCS to be the fear that this chest pain is an indicator of a heart attack or other more serious conditions. As the condition is not dangerous or life-threatening, there is no reason to take medication, although some people may choose to refrain from some normal activities such as physical exercise, as this can exacerbate the pain, particularly if it occurs during physical activity.

== History ==
The syndrome was first described and named in 1893 by Henri Huchard, a French cardiologist, who called it "précordialgie" (from the latin "praecordia" meaning "before the heart"), or "Syndrôme de Huchard" ("Huchard syndrome"). The term "precordial" had entered the French medical lexicon with the 1370 translation of Guy de Chauliac's Chirurgia magna. Previously, the Latin term "praecordia" had been used to refer to the diaphragm, a sense now obsolete.

The Huchard syndrome was then studied more deeply by Miller and Texidor, medical practitioners at the Cardiovascular Department and the Department of Medicine at the Michael Reese Hospital in Chicago, in 1955. They reported the condition in 10 patients, one being Miller himself. In 1978, PCS was discussed by Sparrow and Bird who reported 45 with it, and that it was probably more frequent than generally assumed. PCS in American children has been discussed by Pickering in 1981 and by Reynolds in 1989. Gumbiner reviews PCS as a diagnosis in his 2003 article. Incidences of PCS in swimmers with asthma was analyzed in Hayes, et al.'s article in 2016, constituting the most recent English-language article on the syndrome as of May 2023.

== See also ==
- Side stitch
