= Patrick's test =

- Synonyms: Flexion, ABduction, and External Rotation
- Purpose: evaluate hip joint

Patrick's test or FABER test is performed to evaluate pathology of the hip joint or the sacroiliac joint.

The test is performed by having the tested leg flexed and the thigh abducted and externally rotated. If pain is elicited on the ipsilateral side anteriorly, it is suggestive of a hip joint disorder on the same side. If pain is elicited on the contralateral side posteriorly around the sacroiliac joint, it is suggestive of pain mediated by dysfunction in that joint.

== History ==
Patrick's test is named after the American neurologist Hugh Talbot Patrick.

== See also ==
- Gaenslen's test
- Physical medicine and rehabilitation
