= Yeoman's test =

Physical Exam

- Purpose: detect if individual has sacroiliitis

Yeoman's test is a physical exam performed to determine if a person has sacroiliitis. With the subject prone, the test is performed by rotating the ilium with one hand and extending the hip while the knee is flexed. Pain over the ipsilateral posterior sacroiliac joint area is indicative of sacroiliitis.

This also tests for sacroiliac joint sprain or strain.
