= Side stitch =

Intense pain on the side of the diaphragm that usually occurs when running

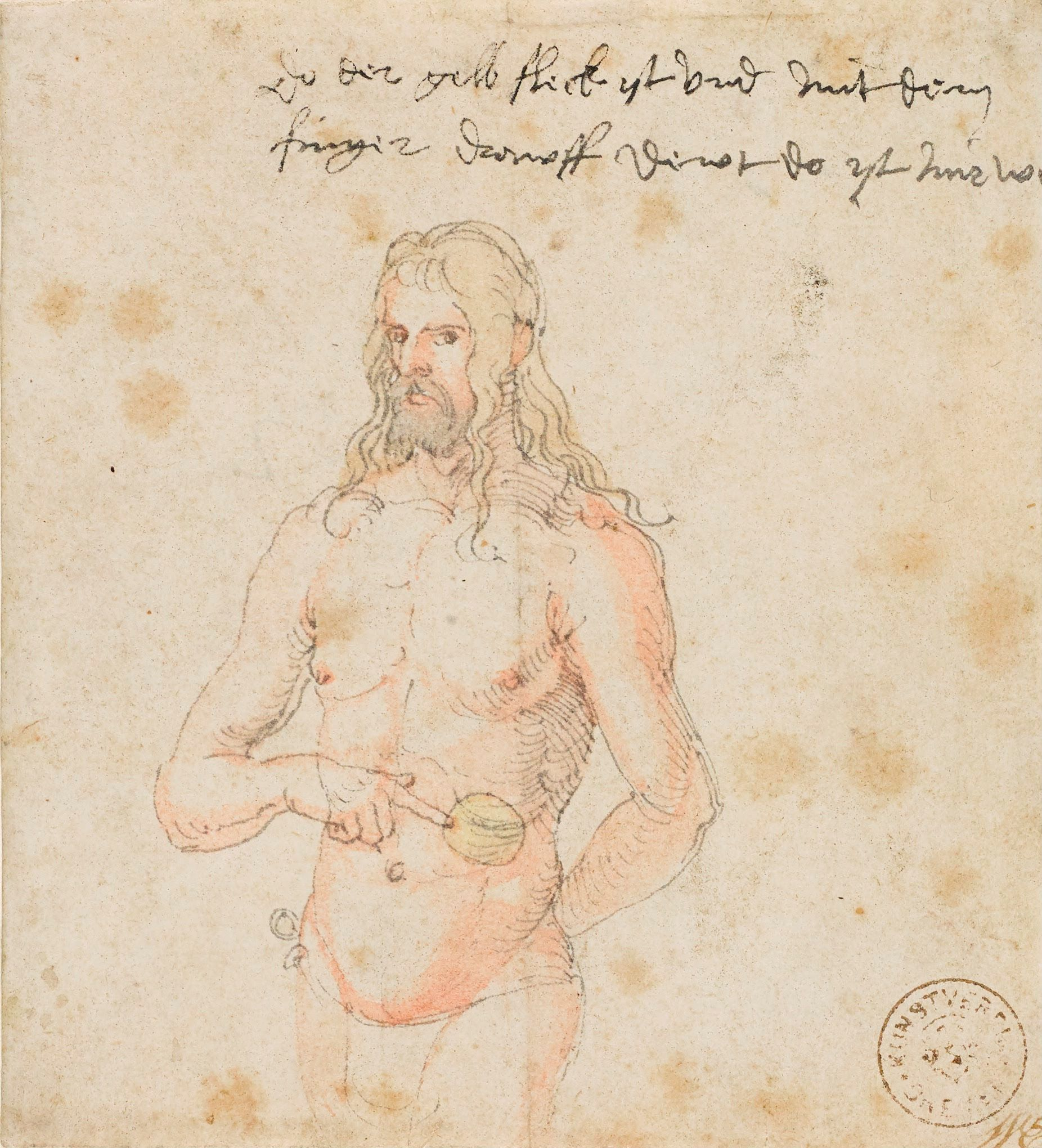
Albrecht Dürer pointing to the location where one feels a stitch in one's side.

A side stitch (or "stitch in one's side") is an intense stabbing abdominal pain under the lower edge of the ribcage that occurs during exercise. It is also called a side ache, side cramp, muscle stitch, or simply stitch, and the medical term is exercise-related transient abdominal pain (ETAP). It sometimes extends to shoulder tip pain, and commonly occurs during running, swimming, and horseback riding. Approximately two-thirds of runners will experience at least one episode of a stitch each year. The precise cause is unclear, although it most likely involves irritation of the abdominal lining, and the condition is more likely after consuming a meal or a sugary beverage. If the pain is present only when exercising and is completely absent at rest, in an otherwise healthy person, it does not require investigation. Typical treatment strategies involve deep breathing and/or manual pressure on the affected area.

== Causes ==
The precise cause of ETAP is unclear. Proposed mechanisms include diaphragmatic ischemia (insufficient oxygen); stress on the supportive visceral ligaments that attach the abdominal organs to the diaphragm; gastrointestinal ischemia or distension; cramping of the abdominal musculature; ischemic pain resulting from compression of the celiac artery by the median arcuate ligament under the diaphragm; aggravation of the spinal nerves; or, most likely, irritation of the parietal peritoneum (abdominal lining).

Although the diaphragm is mostly innervated by the phrenic nerve, and thus could explain referred pain to the shoulder tip region, the main evidence against diaphragmatic ischemia is that ETAP can be induced by activities of low respiratory demand, such as horse, camel, and motorbike riding, where ischemia of the diaphragm is unlikely. In a study using a fluoroscopic technique, diaphragmatic movements during an ETAP episode have been shown to be full and unrestricted. In another study, researchers analyzed flow-volume loops from subjects who were experiencing ETAP and found no compromise in any measures of breathing, suggesting that the diaphragm is not implicated directly in the causation of ETAP.

Some have proposed that this abdominal pain may be caused by internal organs (like the liver and stomach) pulling downwards on the diaphragm, but this hypothesis is inconsistent with its frequent occurrence during swimming, which involves almost no downward force on these organs.

Frictional irritation of the parietal peritoneum has been suggested as a cause of ETAP. The parietal peritoneum is the outer layer of the peritoneum that adheres to the abdominal wall and underside of the diaphragm. Because the portion of the peritoneum that underlies the diaphragm is innervated by the phrenic nerve, it could explain the shoulder tip pain. The parietal peritoneum traverses the entire abdominal wall, which could account for the widespread distribution of ETAP; the tension in the parietal peritoneum is increased with torso extension; children have a proportionally larger peritoneal surface compared to adults, which could explain the increased prevalence of ETAP in younger individuals; and pain arising from the parietal peritoneum relieves quickly on removal of the stimulus, similar to what is observed for ETAP when activity is ceased. After a meal, distention of the stomach could increase friction between the visceral and parietal layers of peritoneum, and sugary beverages could provoke ETAP due to slower emptying of the stomach. In fact, the fluid in the peritoneal cavity is highly responsive to osmotic gradients between it and its vascular supply.

In the absence of a clear cause, any treatment techniques are uncertain. Typical strategies involve deep breathing and/or manual pressure on the affected area.

== Occurrence ==
Side stitches occur in every level of athletes from school-aged children, weekend exercisers, or elite athletes, although they are more common in younger people. Activities that use upper body twists, like running, swimming, and horseback riding, report this affliction more often. Approximately two-thirds of runners will experience at least one episode of a stitch each year.

== See also ==
- Precordial catch syndrome
