= Patellofemoral pain syndrome =

- Other names: Patellar overload syndrome, runner's knee, retropatellar pain syndrome
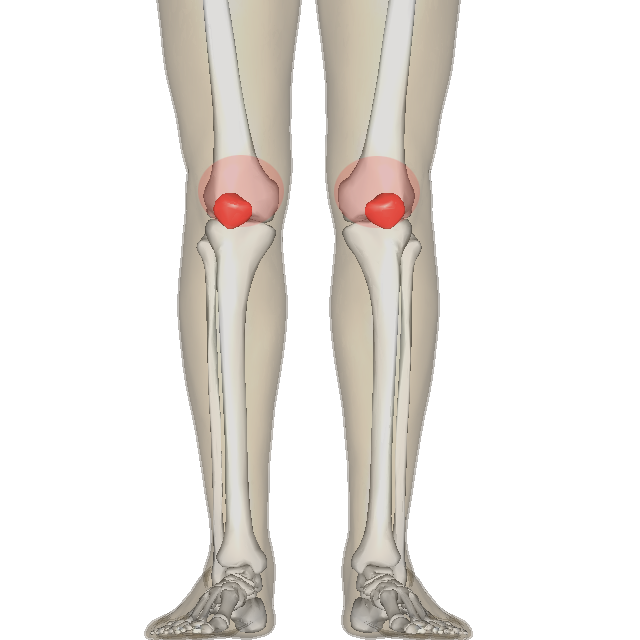
- Diagram of the bones of the lower extremity. Rough distribution of areas affected by PFPS highlighted in red: patella and distal femur.
- Specialty: Orthopedics, sports medicine
- Symptoms: Pain in the front of the knee
- Usual onset: Gradual
- Causes: Unclear
- Risk factors: Trauma, increased training, weak quadriceps muscle
- Diagnostic method: Based on symptoms and examination
- Differential diagnosis: Patellar tendinopathy, infrapatellar bursitis, infrapatellar fat pad syndrome, chondromalacia patellae
- Treatment: Rest, physical therapy
- Prognosis: May last for years
- Frequency: Relatively common

Patellofemoral pain syndrome (PFPS; not to be confused with jumper's knee) is knee pain as a result of problems between the kneecap and the femur. The pain is generally in the front of the knee and comes on gradually. Pain may worsen with sitting down with a bent knee for long periods of time, excessive use, or climbing and descending stairs.

While the exact cause is unclear, it is believed to be due to overuse. Risk factors include trauma, increased training, and a weak quadriceps muscle. It is particularly common among runners. The diagnosis is generally based on the symptoms and examination. If pushing the kneecap into the femur increases the pain, the diagnosis is more likely.

Treatment typically involves rest and rehabilitation with a physical therapist. Runners may need to switch to activities such as cycling or swimming. Insoles may help some people. Symptoms may last for years despite treatment. Patellofemoral pain syndrome is the most common cause of knee pain, affecting more than 20% of young adults. It occurs about 2.5 times more often in females than males.

== Signs and symptoms ==
The onset of the condition is usually gradual, although some cases may appear suddenly following trauma. The most common symptom is diffuse vague pain around the kneecap (peripatellar) and localized pain focused behind the kneecap (retropatellar). Affected individuals typically have difficulty describing the location of the pain. They may place their hands over the anterior patella or describe a circle around the patella. This is often called the "circle sign". Pain is usually initiated when weight is put on the knee extensor mechanism, such as when ascending or descending stairs or slopes, squatting, kneeling, cycling, or running. Pain during prolonged sitting is sometimes termed the "movie sign" or "theatre sign" because individuals might experience pain while sitting to watch a film or similar activity. The pain is typically aching and occasionally sharp. Pain may be worsened by activities. The knee joint may exhibit noises such as clicking. However, this has no relation to pain and function. Giving-way of the knee may be reported. Reduced knee flexion may be experienced during activities.

== Causes ==
In most people with patellofemoral pain syndrome an examination of their history will highlight a precipitating event that caused the injury. Changes in activity patterns such as excessive increases in running mileage, repetitions such as running up steps and the addition of strength exercises that affect the patellofemoral joint are commonly associated with symptom onset. Excessively worn or poorly fitted footwear may be a contributing factor. To prevent recurrence the causal behaviour should be identified and managed correctly. The cause of pain and dysfunction often results from either abnormal forces (e.g. increased pull of the lateral quadriceps retinaculum with acute or chronic lateral patellofemoral subluxation/dislocation) or prolonged repetitive compressive or shearing forces (running or jumping) on the patellofemoral joint. The result is synovial irritation and inflammation and subchondral bony changes in the distal femur or patella known as "bone bruises".

The medical cause of PFPS is thought to be increased pressure or on the patellofemoral joint. There are several theorized mechanisms relating to how this increased pressure occurs:

- Increased levels of physical activity
- Malalignment of the patella or abnormal patellar tracking as it moves through the femoral groove. People with genu valgum have larger than normal Q-angles causing the weight-bearing line to fall lateral to the centre of the knee causing overstretching of the MCL and stressing the lateral meniscus and cartilages.
- Quadriceps muscle imbalance
- Tight anatomical structures, e.g. retinaculum or iliotibial band
- Excessive genu valgum and repetitive motion

Patellofemoral pain syndrome can also result from fractures/trauma, internal knee derangement, osteoarthritis of the knee, and bony tumors in or around the knee.

== Diagnosis ==
=== Examination ===
People can be observed standing and walking to determine patellar alignment. The Q-angle, lateral hypermobility, and J-sign are commonly used to determine patellar maltracking. The patellofemoral glide, tilt, and grind tests (Clarke's sign), when performed, can provide strong evidence for PFPS. Lastly, lateral instability can be assessed via the patellar apprehension test, which is deemed positive when there is pain or discomfort associated with lateral translation of the patella. Various clinical tests have been investigated for diagnostic accuracy. The Active Instability Test, knee pain during stair climbing, Clarke's test, pain with prolonged sitting, patellar inferior pole tilt, and pain during squatting have demonstrated the best accuracy. However, careful consideration is still needed when using these tests to make a differential diagnosis of PFPS. Individuals with PFP may be exhibit higher pain level and lower function.

Magnetic resonance imaging rarely can give useful information for managing patellofemoral pain syndrome and treatment should focus on an appropriate rehabilitation program including correcting strength and flexibility concerns. In the uncommon cases where a patient has mechanical symptoms like a locked knee, knee effusion, or failure to improve following physical therapy, then an MRI may give more insight into diagnosis and treatment.

=== Classification ===
PFPS is one of a handful of conditions sometimes referred to as runner's knee; the other conditions being chondromalacia patellae, iliotibial band syndrome, and plica syndrome.

Chondromalacia patellae is a term sometimes used synonymously with PFPS. However, there is general consensus that PFPS applies only to individuals without cartilage damage, thereby distinguishing it from chondromalacia patellae, a condition with softening of the patellar articular cartilage. Despite this distinction, the diagnosis of PFPS is typically made based only on the history and physical examination rather than on the results of any medical imaging. Therefore, it is unknown whether most persons with a diagnosis of PFPS have cartilage damage or not, making the difference between PFPS and chondromalacia theoretical rather than practical. It is thought that only some individuals with anterior knee pain will have true chondromalacia patellae.

=== Differential diagnosis ===
The diagnosis of patellofemoral pain syndrome is made by ruling out patellar tendinitis, prepatellar bursitis, plica syndrome, Sinding-Larsen and Johansson syndrome, and Osgood–Schlatter disease. Currently, there is not a gold standard assessment to diagnose PFPS.

== Treatment ==
A variety of treatments for patellofemoral pain syndrome are available. Most people respond well to conservative therapy.

=== Exercises ===
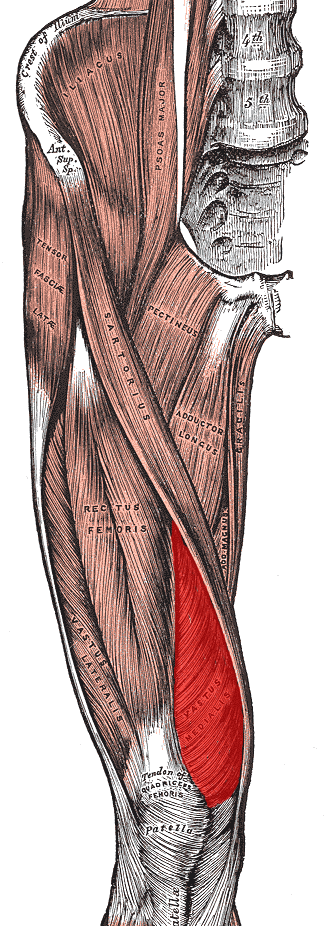
Vastus medialis

Patellofemoral pain syndrome may also result from overuse or overload of the PF joint. For this reason, knee activity should be reduced until the pain is resolved.

There is consistent but low quality evidence that exercise therapy for PFPS reduces pain, improves function and aids long-term recovery. However, there is insufficient evidence to compare the effectiveness of different types of exercises with each other, and exercises with other forms of treatment.

Exercise therapy is the recommended first line treatment of PFPS. Various exercises have been studied and recommended. Exercises are described according to 3 parameters:

- Type of muscle activity (concentric, eccentric or isometric)
- Type of joint movement (dynamic, isometric or static)
- Reaction forces (closed or open kinetic chain)

The majority of exercise programs intended to treat PFPS are designed to strengthen the quadriceps muscles, because their weakness and quadriceps muscle imbalance may contribute to abnormal patellar tracking. If the strength of the vastus medialis muscle is inadequate, the usually larger and stronger vastus lateralis muscle will pull sideways (laterally) on the kneecap. Strengthening the vastus medialis to prevent or counter the lateral force of the vastus lateralis is one way of relieving PFPS, however it is hard to isolate and strengthen only one muscle of quadriceps.

There is also growing evidence that shows proximal factors play a much larger role than vastus medialis (VMO) strength deficits or quadriceps imbalance. Hip abductor, extensor, and external rotator strengthening may help. Emphasis during exercise may be placed on coordinated contraction of the medial and lateral parts of the quadriceps as well as of the hip adductor, hip abductor and gluteal muscles. Many exercise programs include stretches designed to improve lower limb flexibility.

Studies encourage additional targeted strengthening of Gluteal muscles in addition to stretching. Along with the strengthening of quad muscles these targeted exercise programs would reduce knee valgus and strengthen pelvic stability, all of which would result in less stress to the patellofemoral joint.

Electromyographic biofeedback allows visualization of specific muscle contractions and may help individuals performing the exercises to target the intended muscles during the exercise. Neuromuscular electrical stimulation to strengthen quadricep muscles is sometimes suggested, however the effectiveness of this treatment is not certain.

Inflexibility has often been cited as a source of patellofemoral pain syndrome. Stretching of the lateral knee has been suggested to help.

Knee and lumbar joint mobilization are not recommended as primary interventions for PFPS. It can be used as combination intervention, but as we continue to promote use of active and physical interventions for PFPS, passive interventions such as joint mobilizations are not recommended.

When it comes to recovering from PFPS, it is important to build confidence in movement and encourage tissue adaptation without overloading the joint. There are psychological factors such as fear-avoidance and pain catastrophizing may play a role in PFPS.There is evidence that suggests that psychosocial factors, such as fear of movement and negative beliefs about pain, may contribute to prolonged symptoms in PFPS. Mentioning how these behavior patterns can affect symptoms in PFPS can highlight the importance of education of the individual's patterns.

=== Manual therapy ===
Manual therapy in addition to exercises helps in reducing pain, improving function, and knee range of motion in patients with PFPS. Manual therapy such as patellar joint mobilization, manipulation and soft tissue mobilization along with physical therapy exercises is found to be effective in treating PFPS. However, there is not enough evidence that supports lumbopelvic spine manipulation has any effect on the quadriceps muscle activation to improve function & reduce pain.

=== Medication ===
Non-steroidal anti-inflammatory drugs are widely used to treat PFPS; however, there is only very limited evidence that they are effective. They may reduce pain in the short term; overall, however, after three months pain is not improved. There is no evidence that one type is superior to another in PFPS, and therefore some authors have recommended that the non-steroidal with fewest side effects and which is cheapest should be used.

Glycosaminoglycan polysulfate (GAGPS) inhibits proteolytic enzymes and increases synthesis and degree of polymerization of hyaluronic acid in synovial fluid. There is contradictory evidence that it is effective in PFPS.

=== Braces and taping ===
There is no difference in pain symptoms between taping and non-taping in individuals with PFPS. Although taping alone is not shown to reduce pain, studies show that taping in conjunction with therapeutic exercise can have a significant effect on pain reduction.

Knee braces are ineffective in treating PFPS. The technique of McConnell taping involves pulling the patella medially with tape (medial glide). Findings from some studies suggest that there is limited benefit with patella taping or bracing when compared to quadriceps exercises alone. There is a lack of evidence to show that knee braces, sleeves, or straps are effective. There is no specific one treatment for all PFPS patients as most trials were underpowered. Over 80% of the reviewed trials did not show clinical benefits. The benefits may be sub-group specific and often short-term.

=== Insoles ===
Low arches can cause overpronation or the feet to roll inward too much increasing load on the patellofemoral joint. Poor lower extremity biomechanics may cause stress on the knees and can be related to the development of patellofemoral pain syndrome, although the exact mechanism linking joint loading to the development of the condition is not clear. Foot orthoses can help to improve lower extremity biomechanics and may be used as a component of overall treatment. Foot orthoses may be useful for reducing knee pain in the short term, and may be combined with exercise programs or physical therapy. However, there is no evidence supporting use of combined exercise with foot orthoses as intervention beyond 12 months for adults. Evidence for long term use of foot orthoses for adolescents is uncertain. No evidence supports use of custom made foot orthoses.

=== Surgery ===
The scientific consensus is that surgery should be avoided except in severe cases where conservative treatments have failed. The majority of individuals with PFPS receive nonsurgical treatment.

For people with chronic, severe patellofemoral pain, radiofrequency ablation of certain knee nerves may be applied as an outpatient procedure to reduce chronic arthritic pain. Using radiofrequency energy delivered via small electrodes positioned at target genicular nerves, the treatment achieves partial sensory denervation of the joint capsule. Despite the extensive innervation of the knee, specifically targeting the superior lateral, superior medial, and inferior medial genicular nerves has proved to be an effective ablation method for reducing chronic knee pain. In clinical research, such treatment has been shown to produce about 50% less knee pain for up to two years after the procedure.

Local injections of dilute phenol (1.5–3 ml of 6% phenol in sterile water) at three to five sensory knee nerves may be used as an alternative neurolytic treatment to relieve chronic severe knee pain.

=== Alternative medicine ===
The use of electrophysical agents and therapeutic modalities are not recommended as passive treatments should not be the focus of the plan of care. There is no evidence to support the use of acupuncture or low-level laser therapy. Most studies claiming benefits of alternative therapies for PFPS were conducted with flawed experimental design, and therefore did not produce reliable results.

== Prognosis ==
Patellofemoral pain syndrome can become a chronic injury, with an estimated 50% of people reporting persistent patellar-femoral pain after a year. Risk factors for a prolonged recovery (or persistent condition) include age (older athletes), females, increased body weight, a reduction in muscle strength, time to seek care, and in those who experience symptoms for more than two months.

== Epidemiology ==
Patellofemoral pain syndrome is the most common cause of anterior knee pain in the outpatient. Specific populations at high risk of primary PFPS include runners, bicyclists, basketball players, young athletes and females.

BMI did not significantly increase risk of developing PFPS in adolescents. However, adults with PFPS have higher BMI than those without. It is suggested that higher BMI is associated with limited physical activity in people with PFPS as physical activity levels decrease as a result of pain associated with the condition. However, no longitudinal studies are able to show that BMI can be a predictor of development or progression of the condition.
