= Plica syndrome =

- Other names: Synovial plica syndrome
- Specialty: Orthopedics

Plica syndrome is a condition that occurs when a plica (a vestigial extension of the protective synovial capsule of usually the knee) becomes irritated, enlarged, or inflamed.

== Cause ==
This inflammation is typically caused by the plica being caught on the femur, or pinched between the femur and the patella. The most common location of plica tissue is along the medial (inside) side of the knee. The plica can tether the patella to the femur, be located between the femur and patella, or be located along the femoral condyle. If the plica tethers the patella to the femoral condyle, the symptoms may cause it to be mistaken for chondromalacia.

The plica themselves are remnants of the fetal stage of development where the knee is divided into three compartments. The plica normally diminish in size during the second trimester of fetal development, as the three compartments develop into the synovial capsule. In adults, they normally exist as sleeves of tissue called synovial folds. The plica are usually harmless and unobtrusive; plica syndrome only occurs when the synovial capsule becomes irritated, which thickens the plica themselves (making them prone to irritation/inflammation, or being caught on the femur).

== Diagnosis ==
If the plica tethers the patella to the femoral condyle, the symptoms may cause it to be mistaken for chondromalacia patellae. Diagnosis is often complicated by the thin structures of plicae, fenestrated septum or unfenestrated septum all being too fine to resolve well even in MRI.

== Treatment ==
Plica syndrome treatment focuses on decreasing inflammation of the synovial capsule. A nonsteroidal anti-inflammatory drug (NSAID) is often used in conjunction with therapeutic exercise and modalities. Iontophoresis and phonophoresis have been utilized successfully against inflammation of the plica and synovial capsule. Failing these, surgical removal of the plica of the affected knee may be necessary.

== See also ==
- Knee pain
- Patellofemoral pain syndrome
- Iliotibial band syndrome
