= Infrapatellar bursitis =

Inflammation of the synovial fluid sac below the kneecap

- Other names: Pastor's knee, Vicar's knee, clergyman's knee
- Cross section of the human knee
- Types: Superficial, deep
- Risk factors: Kneeling, crawling
- Diagnostic method: Based on symptom and physical examination
- Differential diagnosis: Patellar tendonitis, prepatellar bursitis
- Frequency: Relatively rare

Infrapatellar bursitis, also known as pastor's knee, is inflammation of the superficial or deep infrapatellar bursa. Symptoms may include knee pain, swelling, and redness just below the kneecap. It may be complicated by patellar tendonitis.

Risk factors include kneeling or crawling. It may also be brought on by frequent bending of the knees while standing, squatting, running, or jumping. Diagnosis is generally based on symptom and physical examination. When the deep bursa is involved, bending the knee generally increases the pain. Other conditions that may appear similar include patellar tendonitis and prepatellar bursitis.

Treatment is generally by rest, alternating between ice and heat, and NSAIDs. Infrapatellar bursitis is relatively rare. Due to the kneeling being enjoined in church services, infrapatellar bursitis has also been called pastor's knee, vicar's knee and clergyman's knee.
