= Knee pain =

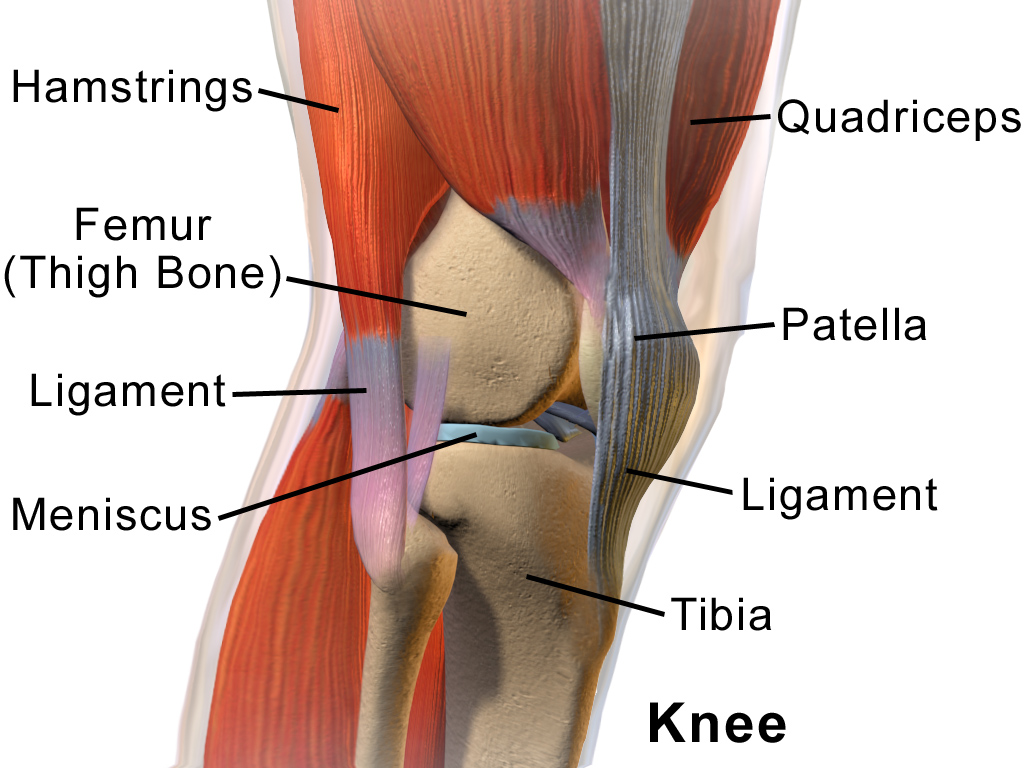
- Human knee
- Specialty: Orthopedics

Knee pain is pain in or around the knee.

The knee joint consists of an articulation between four bones: the femur, tibia, fibula and patella. The location and severity of knee pain may vary, depending on the cause of the problem. Signs and symptoms that sometimes accompany knee pain include:

- Swelling and stiffness
- Redness and warmth to the touch
- Weakness or instability
- Popping or crunching noises
- Inability to fully straighten the knee

== Causes ==
=== Injuries ===
Some common injuries based on the location include:

- Sprain (Ligament sprain)
  - Medial collateral ligament
  - Lateral collateral ligament
  - Anterior cruciate ligament
  - Posterior cruciate ligament
- Tear of meniscus
  - Medial meniscus
  - Lateral meniscus
- Strain (Muscle strain)
  - Quadriceps muscles
  - Hamstring muscles
  - Popliteal muscle
  - Patellar tendon
  - Hamstring tendon
  - Popliteal tendon
- Hemarthrosis – Hemarthrosis tends to develop over a relatively short period after injury, from several minutes to a few hours.

=== Fractures ===
- Femoral fracture
- Tibial fracture
- Patella fracture

=== Diseases ===
Some of the diseases of cause of knee pain include the following:

- Knee osteoarthritis
- Chondromalacia patella
- Baker's cyst
- Meniscal cyst
- Discoid meniscus
- Osgood-Schlatter disease
- Larsen-Johansson disease
- Knee rheumatoid arthritis
- Osteochondritis dissecans disease
- Synovial chondromatosis disease
- Tumors
- Ankylosing spondylitis
- Reactive arthritis
- Tuberculosis arthritis
- Septic arthritis (Pyogenic arthritis)
- Osteomyelitis
- Hemophilic arthritis
- Gout (Gouty arthritis)
- Neuroma

=== Inflammations ===
- Bursitis of the knee
  - Prepatellar bursitis - Housemaid's knee (most common)
  - Infrapatellar bursitis - Clergyman's knee (Superficial infrapatellar bursitis and Deep infrapatellar bursitis)
  - Semimembranosus bursitis
- Tendinitis
  - Patellar tendinitis (Jumper's knee)
  - Hamstring tendinitis
  - Popliteal tendinitis
- Synovitis of the knee

=== Deformities ===
Common deformities of the knee include:

- Bipartite patella (two-part kneecap)
- Genu varum (bow legs)
- Genu valgum (knock-knees)
- Genu recurvatum (Knee hyperextension)
- Knee flexion deformity

=== Syndromes ===
- Patellofemoral pain syndrome
- Plica syndrome
- Iliotibial band syndrome
- Hoffa's syndrome
- Joint hypermobility syndrome

=== Dislocations ===
- Patella dislocation
- Knee joint dislocation (Tibiofemoral joint dislocation)

=== Cold temperature ===
Knee pain is more common among people working in the cold than in those in normal temperature. Cold-induced knee pain may also be due to tenosynovitis of the tendons around the knee, in which cold exposure has a specific role, either as a causative or a contributing factor. Frank arthritis has been reported in children due to frostbite from extreme cold causing direct chondrocyte injury.

There is also a hereditary disease, familial cold autoinflammatory syndrome (FCAS), which often features knee pain, in addition to hives, fever and pain in other joints, following general exposure to cold.

=== Knee pain due to less physical movement ===
A lower level of physical activity and a work environment where one is required to sit in a chair during the work day is one reason for developing knee joint pain, as the lower degree of physical movement tends to weaken the knee muscles. Blood vessels also can be affected, leading to development of painful conditions. Working on building strength through a full range of motion is crucial for rebuilding strength and getting rid of knee pain.

As age progresses the movement of the knee joint involves higher friction with adjacent tissue and cartilages.

=== Other causes ===
- Ligamentous laxity
- Fat pad impingement
- Knee effusion
- Deep vein thrombosis
- Peripheral vascular disease
- Exostosis
- Obesity = A systematic review and meta-analysis found that approximately 25% of new-onset knee pain cases were attributable to overweight

=== Referred knee pain ===
Referred pain is that pain perceived at a site different from its point of origin but innervated by the same spinal segment. Sometimes knee pain may be related to another area from body. For example, knee pain can come from ankle, foot, hip joints or lumbar spine.

== Diagnosis ==
Knee MRIs should be avoided for knee pain without symptoms or effusion, unless there are non-successful results from a functional rehabilitation program.

In some diagnosis, such as in knee osteoarthritis, magnetic resonance imaging does not prove to be clear for its determination.

== Management ==
Although surgery has a role in repairing traumatic injuries and broken bones, arthroscopic surgeries do not provide significant or lasting improvements to either pain or function to people with knee pain, and therefore should almost never be performed. Knee pain is pain caused by wear and tear, such as osteoarthritis or a meniscal tear. Effective treatments for knee pain include physical therapy exercises, pain-reducing drugs such as ibuprofen, joint stretching, knee replacement surgery, and weight loss in people who are overweight.

Overall, a combination of interventions seems to be the best choice when treating knee pain. Interventions such as exercises that target both the knee and the hip, foot bracing, and patellar taping are all recommended for use with patients who have knee pain.

Current evidence suggests that psychological factors are elevated in individuals with patellofemoral pain. Non-physical factors such as anxiety, depression, fear of movement, and catastrophizing are thought to have a linear correlation with increased pain experience and decreased physical function. Catastrophizing is defined as imagining the worst possible outcome of an action or event. The psychosocial factors may have either a positive or negative impact on adherence to rehabilitation programs for managing knee pain. Furthermore, studies have found knee pain to be negatively associated with health-related quality of life, and an increase in knee pain to be associated with a reduction in patient-reported quality of life, as compared to those with no or stable knee pain, even in the relatively younger middle-aged population.

=== Stair Descent ===
"...backward descending movement...pain control and knee joint protection..."

== Epidemiology ==
About 25% of people over the age of 50 experience knee pain from degenerative knee diseases.

== Society and culture ==
In the United States, more than US$3 billion is spent each year on arthroscopic knee surgeries that are known to be ineffective in people with degenerative knee pain.
