= Iliotibial tract =

Longitudinal fibrous reinforcement of the fascia lata

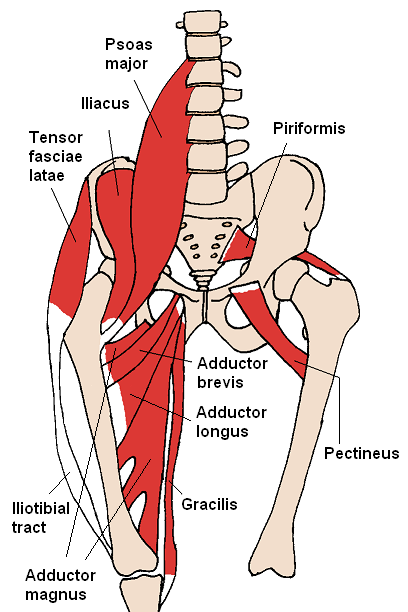
- Iliotibial tract and nearby structures.

Details
- Origin: Anterolateral iliac tubercle portion of the external lip of the iliac crest
- Insertion: Lateral condyle of the tibia

Identifiers
- Latin: tractus iliotibialis
- TA98: A04.7.03.003
- TA2: 2690
- FMA: 51048

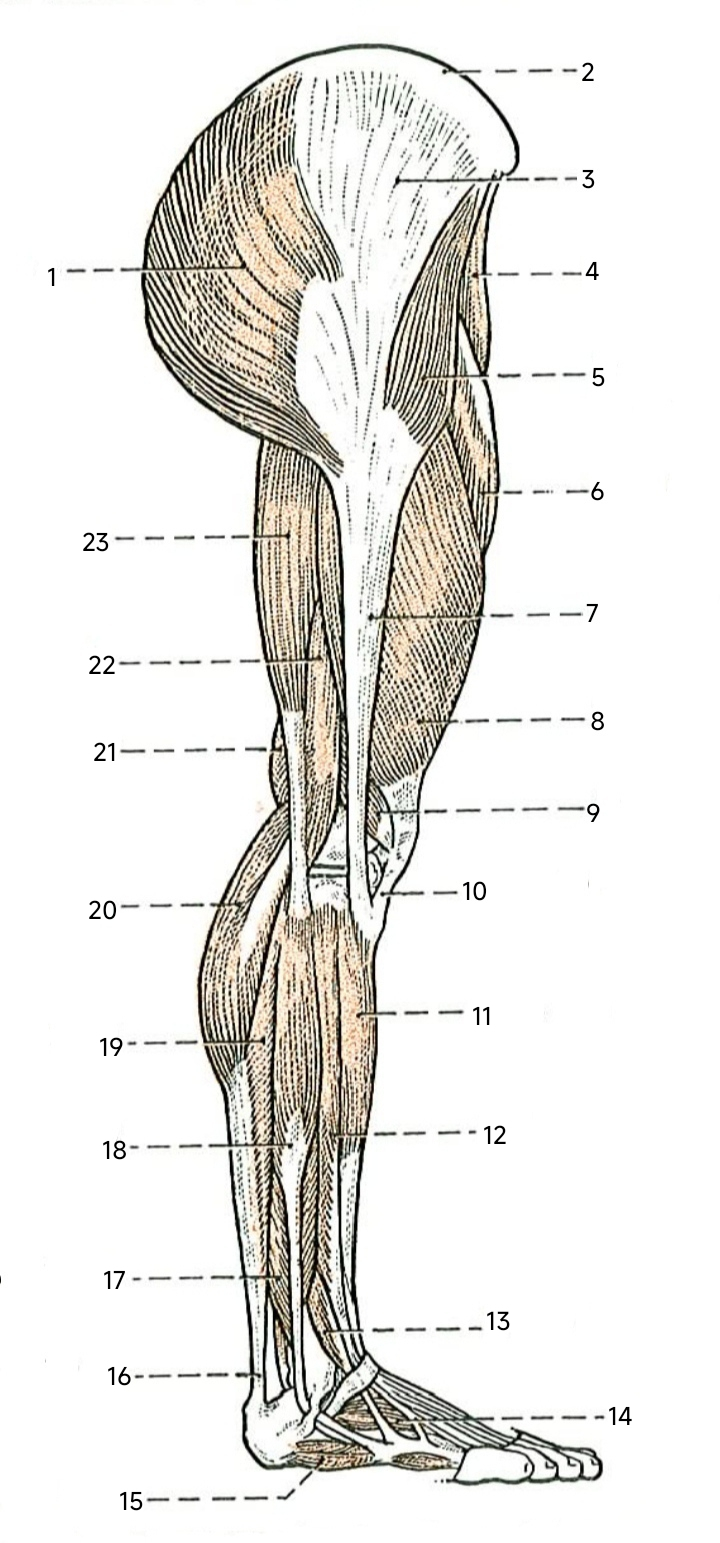
Muscles of the lower limb; right side, lateral view. The iliotibial tract is labeled 7. (After Charpy.)

The iliotibial tract or iliotibial band (ITB; also known as Maissiat's band or the IT band) is a longitudinal fibrous reinforcement of the fascia lata. The action of the muscles associated with the ITB (tensor fasciae latae and some fibers of gluteus maximus) flex, extend, abduct, and laterally and medially rotate the hip. The ITB contributes to lateral knee stabilization. During knee extension the ITB moves anterior to the lateral condyle of the femur, while ~30 degrees knee flexion, the ITB moves posterior to the lateral condyle. However, it has been suggested that this is only an illusion due to the changing tension in the anterior and posterior fibers during movement. It originates at the anterolateral iliac tubercle portion of the external lip of the iliac crest and inserts at the lateral condyle of the tibia at Gerdy's tubercle. The figure shows only the proximal part of the iliotibial tract.

The part of the iliotibial band which lies beneath the tensor fasciae latae is prolonged upward to join the lateral part of the capsule of the hip-joint. The tensor fasciae latae effectively tightens the iliotibial band around the area of the knee. This allows for bracing of the knee especially in lifting the opposite foot.

The gluteus maximus muscle and the tensor fasciae latae insert upon the tract.

== Clinical significance ==
The IT band stabilizes the knee both in extension and in partial flexion, and is therefore used constantly during walking and running. When a person is leaning forwards with a slightly flexed knee, the tract is the knee's main support against gravity.

Iliotibial band syndrome (ITBS or ITBFS, for iliotibial band friction syndrome) is a common thigh injury generally associated with running. It can also be caused by cycling or hiking. The onset of iliotibial band syndrome occurs most commonly in cases of overuse. The iliotibial band itself becomes inflamed in response to repeated compression on the outside of the knee or swelling of the fat pad between the bone and the tendon on the side of the knee. ITB syndrome can also be caused by poor physical condition, lack of warming up before exercise, or drastic changes in activity levels. Until recent anatomical studies showed differently, the previously held belief was that the distal portion of the iliotibial band rubbed over a bursa, however this bursa was found not to exist. Additionally, the theory that the iliotibial band needs to stretch has been questioned as, in cadaveric studies under extreme load, the flexibility of the iliotibial band has been shown to be minimal with greater stiffness than capsular fibers.

Symptoms of iliotibial band syndrome may include pain on the outside of the knee at the beginning of exercise which persists through the exercise or specific movements like running downhill and having the knee bent for prolonged periods of time.

This syndrome is usually developed by people who suddenly increase their level of activity, such as runners who increase their mileage. Other risk factors for ITBS include gait abnormalities such as overpronation, leg length discrepancies, or bow-leggedness. ITB Syndrome is an overuse condition of the distal ITB near the lateral femoral condyle and at Gerdy's tubercle. The most vulnerable range of knee flexion for this condition is at 30-40 degrees; this is where the ITB crosses the lateral femoral epicondyle.

== Postural function ==
The IT band is of critical importance to asymmetrical standing (pelvic slouch). The upward pull on the lower attachment of the IT band thrusts the knee back into hyperextension, thereby locking the knee and converting the limb into a rigid supportive pillar.
