= Iliotibial band syndrome =

- Other names: Iliotibial band friction syndrome (ITBFS)
- Specialty: Sports medicine, orthopedics

Iliotibial band syndrome (ITBS), also known as windshield wiper syndrome or runner's knee, is the second most common knee injury. It is caused by inflammation located on the lateral aspect of the knee due to friction between the iliotibial band and the lateral epicondyle of the femur. Pain is felt most commonly on the lateral aspect of the knee and is most intensive at 30 degrees of knee flexion. Risk factors in women include increased hip adduction and knee internal rotation. Risk factors seen in men are increased hip internal rotation and knee adduction. ITB syndrome is most associated with long-distance running, cycling, weight-lifting, and with military training.

== Signs and symptoms ==
Symptoms range from a stinging sensation just above the knee and outside of the knee (lateral side of the knee) joint, to swelling or thickening of the tissue in the area where the band moves over the femur. The stinging sensation just above the knee joint is felt on the outside of the knee or along the entire length of the iliotibial band. At initial symptom onset pain typically occurs following activity, but as the condition progresses pain is frequently felt during activities and may be present at rest. Pain may also be present above and below the knee, where the ITB attaches to the tibia. Pain is frequently worsened by running up or downhill or by stride lengthening.

== Risk factors ==
ITBS is associated with various risk factors including training habits, anatomical abnormalities, or muscular imbalances:

Training habits

- Spending long periods of time/regularly sitting in lotus posture in yoga, especially beginners forcing the feet onto the top of the thighs
- Consistently running on a horizontally banked surface (such as the shoulder of a road or an indoor track) on which the downhill leg is bent slightly inward, causing extreme stretching of the band against the femur
- Inadequate warmup or cool-down
- Excessive uphill and downhill running
- Positioning the feet "toed-in" to an excessive angle when cycling. (Knee should be positioned between 30 and 35 degree to help avoid ITBS)
- Running up and down stairs
- Hiking long distances
- Rowing
- Breaststroke
- Treading water

Abnormalities in leg/feet anatomy

- High or low arches
- Supination of the foot
- Excessive lower-leg rotation due to over-pronation
- Excessive foot-strike force
- Uneven leg lengths
- Bowlegs or tightness about the iliotibial band.

Muscle imbalance

- Weak hip abductor muscles
- Weak/nonfiring multifidus muscle
- Uneven left-right stretching of the band, which could be caused by habits such as sitting cross-legged

== Mechanism ==
Iliotibial band syndrome is one of the leading causes of lateral knee pain in runners. The iliotibial band is a thick band of fascia composing the tendon of the tensor fasciae latae muscle. It is located on the lateral aspect of the knee, extending from the outside of the pelvis, over the hip and knee, and inserting just below the knee. The band serves to stabilize the knee. It has been proposed that during activity such as running and cycling the iliotibial band slides back and forth over the lateral femoral epicondyle, which causes friction and inflammation of the band. It has also been suggested that symptoms are caused by impingement of the iliotibial band in the knee during 30 degree flexion, which is a position common in running and cycling. Additional proposed mechanisms causing the symptoms of ITBS include compression of the fat and soft tissues beneath the iliotibial band, and chronic iliotibial band bursitis.

== Diagnosis ==
Diagnosis of iliotibial band syndrome is primarily based on history and physical exam findings, including tenderness at the lateral femoral epicondyle, where the iliotibial band passes over the bone.

=== Exam maneuvers ===
There are several physical exam maneuvers used to test iliotibial band function and provoke symptoms diagnostic of ITBS. The Noble test is used to assess for iliotibial band disfuction, in which the examiner extends the patient's knee from the 90 degree position with pain over the lateral femoral epicondyle occurring at 30 degrees of flexion. Additional tests include the Ober test to detect iliotibial band contracture, where the patient lies on their side and the examiner attempts to abduct, extend, and then adduct the leg. A positive test occurs with inability to adduct the leg due to iliotibial band shortening. The Thomas test is used to detect excessive tightness of the iliotibial band. In this test the patient holds the unaffected leg to their chest while the examiner straightens and lowers the other leg to a horizontal position, inability to fully straighten and lower the leg indicates excessive band tightness.

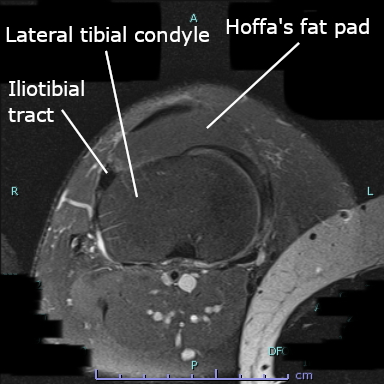
The iliotibial band may be assessed by MRI in severe cases.

=== Imaging ===
Imaging studies are generally not needed for diagnosis of ITBS, as characteristic symptoms and physical exam findings are sufficient for diagnosis. However, in severe or persistent cases MRI may be used to confirm the diagnosis as well as rule out other causes of lateral knee pain. Ultrasonography may also be used to evaluate disease progression by measuring iliotibial band thickness.

=== Differential ===
Other conditions that may present with knee pain similar to ITBS that must be differentiated include a lateral meniscus tear, degenerative joint disease, tendinopathy of the biceps femoris, stress fracture, patellofemoral pain syndrome, and injury to the lateral collateral ligament.

== Treatment ==
While ITBS pain can be acute, the iliotibial band can be treated conservatively with rest, ice, compression and elevation (RICE) to reduce pain and inflammation, followed by stretching. Utilization of corticosteroid injections and the use of oral nonsteroidal anti-inflammatory drugs (NSAIDs) or topical NSAIDs on the painful area are possible treatments for ITB syndrome. Corticosteroid injections have been shown to decrease running pains significantly 7 days after the initial treatment. Similar results can be found with the use of anti-inflammatory medication, analgesic/anti-inflammatory medication, specifically. Physical therapy is an effective treatment modality, with the goal of stretching the iliotibial band, tensor fasciae latae, and gluteus medius. Other non-invasive treatments include modalities such as flexibility and strength training, neuromuscular/gait training, manual therapy, training volume reduction, myofascial release, or changes in running shoe. Muscular training of the gluteus maximus and hip external rotators is stressed highly as those muscles are associated with many of the risk factors of ITBS. For runners specifically, neuromuscular/gait training may be needed for success in muscular training interventions to ensure that those trained muscles are used properly in the mechanics of running. Strength training alone will not result in decrease in pain due to ITBS, however, gait training, on its own can result in running form modification that reduces the prevalence of risk factors.

=== Surgery ===
Surgery treatments are utilized if several conservative approaches fail to produce results. 6 months of conservative treatments are generally used before surgical intervention. Surgery typically involves removal of a small piece of the iliotibial band to release excessive tension. Other procedures that have been utilized include resection of the iliotibial band bursa and z-lengthening. In the z-lengthening procedure, two horizontal incisions are made in the band and connected by a vertical incision, forming a z. The resulting sections are reattached together in a lengthened position, increasing the length of the band.

== Prognosis ==
ITBS symptoms typically improve with treatment. An estimated 50–90% of patients have symptom resolution with 4–8 weeks of conservative treatment, while surgical patients also generally have good outcomes. Complications of ITBS include recurrence and exacerbation by return to activity following treatment, as well as possible progression to patellofemoral pain syndrome.

== Epidemiology ==
=== Occupation ===
ITBS commonly affects athletes and has been reported in runners, cyclists, rowers, skiers, and triathletes, as well as basketball, soccer, and field hockey players.

Significant association between the diagnosis of ITBS and occupational background of the patients has been thoroughly determined. Occupations that require extensive use of the iliotibial band are more susceptible to developing ITBS due to a continuum of their iliotibial band repeatedly abrading against the lateral epicondyle prominence, thereby inducing an inflammatory response. Professional or amateur runners are at high clinical risk of ITBS, and there is a greater risk in those running long-distance. Study suggests ITBS alone makes up 12% of all running-related injuries and 1.6% to 12% of runners are affected by ITBS.

The relationship between ITBS and mortality/morbidity is claimed to be absent. A study showed that coordination variability did not vary significantly between runners with no injury and runners with ITBS. This result elucidates that the runner's ability to coordinate themselves toward direction of their intention (motor coordination) is not, or very minorly affected by the pain of ITBS.

Additionally, military trainee in marine boot camps displayed high incidence rate of ITBS. Varying incidence rate of 5.3–22% in basic training was reported in a case study. A report from the U.S. Marine Corps announces that running/overuse-related injuries accounted for >12% of all injuries.

Studies suggest that there is not a difference in ITBS incidence rate between patients of different race, gender, or age. However, there has been a claim that females are more prone to ITBS due to their anatomical differences in the pelvis and lower extremities. Males with a larger lateral epicondyle prominence may also be more susceptible to ITBS. Higher incidence rate of ITBS has been reported between the ages of 15 and 50, which generally includes most active athletes.

Other professions that had noticeable association with ITBS include cyclists, heavy weightlifters, et cetera. One observational study discovered 24% of 254 cyclists were diagnosed with ITBS within 6 years. A study provided data that shows more than half (50%) of professional cyclists complain of knee pain. Additional studies have shown that ITBS makes up 15–24% of all overuse injuries in cyclists.

== History ==
ITBS was originally described by Lieutenant Commander James W. Renne in 1975 after observing frequent lateral knee pain in recruits participating in intensive military training. He initially named the syndrome iliotibial band friction syndrome.

== See also ==
- Chondromalacia patellae
- Patellofemoral pain syndrome
- Plica syndrome
