= Patellar tendinitis =

Inflammation of the tendon connecting the kneecap to the shinbone

- Other names: quadriceps tendinopathy, patellar tendinopathy, jumper's knee, patellar tendinosis, patellar tendinitis
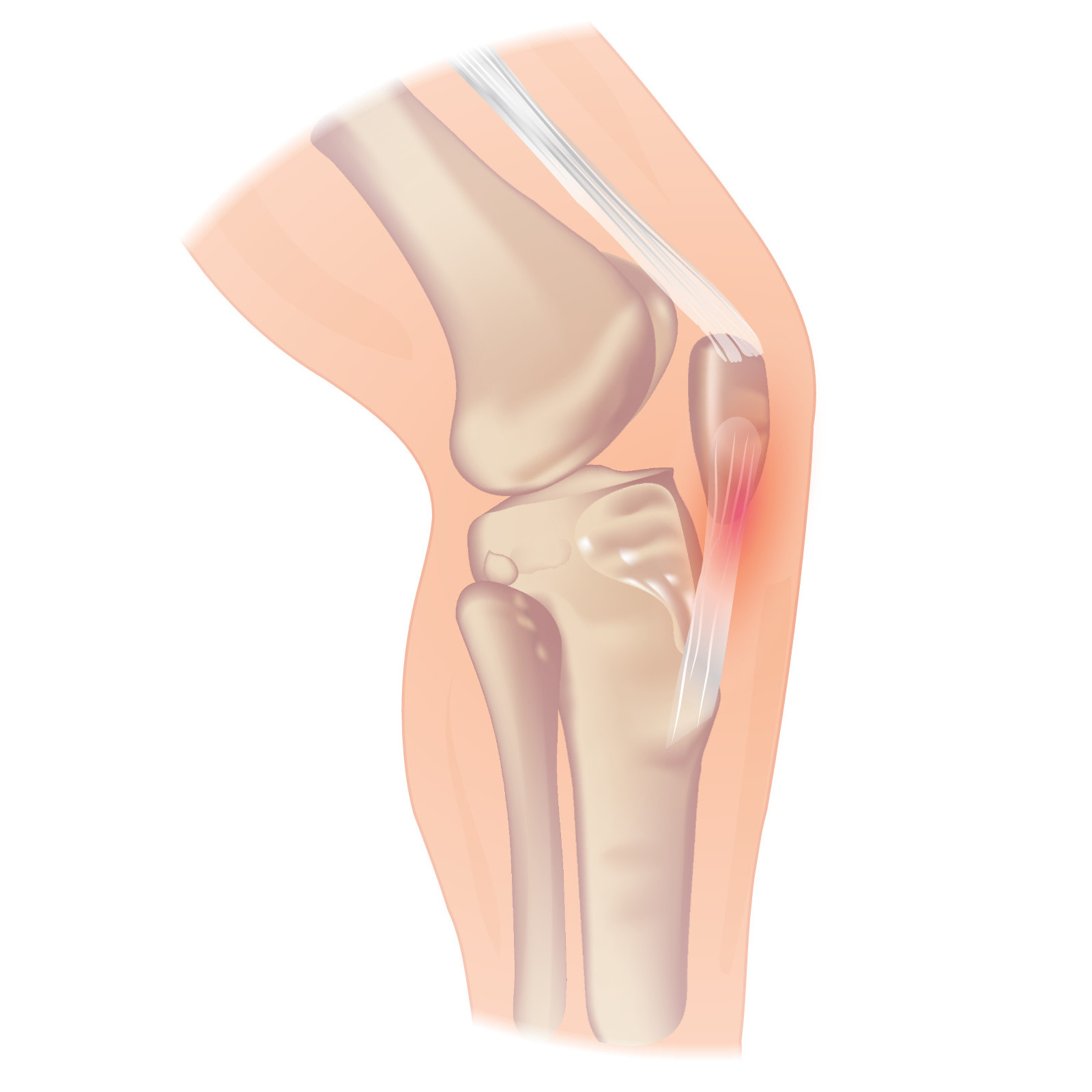
- Location of the pain in patellar tendinitis
- Specialty: Orthopedics, sports medicine
- Symptoms: Pain at the front of the knee
- Complications: Patellar tendon rupture
- Risk factors: Jumping sports, manual labor occupation, being overweight
- Diagnostic method: Based on symptoms and examination
- Differential diagnosis: Chondromalacia patella, Osgood-Schlatter disease, patellofemoral syndrome, infrapatellar bursitis
- Prevention: Allowing proper recovery time between joint-stressing activities
- Treatment: Rest, physical therapy
- Prognosis: Recovery can be slow
- Frequency: 14% of athletes

Patellar tendinitis, also known as jumper's knee, is an overuse injury of the tendon that straightens the knee. Symptoms include pain in the front of the knee. Typically the pain and tenderness is at the lower part of the kneecap, though the upper part may also be affected. Generally there is no pain when the person is at rest. Complications may include patellar tendon rupture.

Risk factors include being involved in athletics and being overweight. It is particularly common in athletes who are involved in jumping sports such as basketball and volleyball. Other risk factors include sex, age, occupation, and physical activity level. It is increasingly more likely to be developed with increasing age. The underlying mechanism involves small tears in the tendon connecting the kneecap with the shinbone. Diagnosis is generally based on symptoms and examination. Other conditions that can appear similar include infrapatellar bursitis, chondromalacia patella and patellofemoral syndrome.

Treatment often involves resting the knee and physical therapy. Evidence for treatments, including rest, however is poor. Recovery can take months and persist over years. It is relatively common with about 14% of elite athletes currently affected; however research reflects that more than half of athletes with this injury end their careers as a result. Males are more commonly affected than females. The term "jumper's knee" was coined in 1973.

== Signs and symptoms ==
People report anterior knee pain, often with an aching quality. The symptom onset is insidious. Rarely is a discrete injury described. Usually, the problem is below the kneecap but it may also be above. Jumper's knee can be classified into 1 of 4 stages, as follows:

Stage 1: Pain only after activity, without functional impairment

Stage 2: Pain during and after activity, although the person is still able to perform satisfactorily in his or her sport

Stage 3: Prolonged pain during and after activity, with increasing difficulty in performing at a satisfactory level

Stage 4: Complete tendon tear requiring surgical repair

It begins as inflammation in the patellar tendon where it attaches to the patella and may progress by tearing or degenerating the tendon. People present with an ache over the patella tendon. Magnetic resonance imaging can reveal edema (increased T2 signal intensity) in the proximal aspect of the patellar tendon.

== Causes ==
Patellar tendinitis is an overuse injury from repetitive overloading or repetitive stress of the patellar tendon of the knee leading to microtears and inflammation that do not have time to heal before the next use. This repetitive stress is often associated with excessive repetition of knee extension.Patellar tendonitis is common in athletes who participate in activities that include a lot of jumping, changing directions, or running. Risk factors for patellar tendonitis are low ankle dorsiflexion (stiff ankles) and ankle sprains, weak gluteal muscles, and muscle tightness, particularly in the calves, quadriceps muscle, and hamstrings.

== Diagnosis ==
Diagnosis is generally based on symptoms and a physical examination. Ultrasound, X-ray, or magnetic resonance imaging may help clarify how severe the problem is.

Having a clinical diagnosis is the preferred way to diagnose patellar tendonitis, due to ultrasonographic abnormality.

== Treatment ==
Evidence for treatment is poor. In the early stages rest, ice, compression, and elevation may be tried. Tentative evidence supports exercises involving eccentric muscle contractions of the quadriceps on a decline board. Specific exercises and stretches to strengthen the muscles and tendons may be recommended, e.g. cycling or swimming. Use of a strap for jumper's knee and suspension inlays for shoes may also reduce the problems. NSAIDs are generally recommended for pain management, but not for long-term treatment. Without proper rest and rehabilitation, patellar tendonitis can worsen, causing persistent pain and increase the risk of a patellar tendon rupture.

=== Procedures ===
Dry needling, sclerosing injections, platelet-rich plasma, extracorporeal shock wave treatment (ESWT), and heat therapy have been tried. According to a systematic review comparing extracorporeal shock wave treatment to conservative treatment, it was found with low certainty that ESWT has a large treatment effect to reduce short term pain. Novel treatment modalities targeting the abnormal blood vessel growth which occurs in the condition are currently being investigated.

=== Surgery ===
Surgery may be tried if other measures fail. This may involve removal of myxoid degeneration in the tendon. This is reserved for people with severe pain for 6–12 months despite conservative measures. Knee operations in most cases have no better effects than exercise programs.

== Epidemiology ==
It is relatively common, with about 14% of elite level athletes currently affected. It potentially more prevalent in a non-athletic population, particularly in individuals with a high body mass index (BMI). Males are more commonly affected than females. Individuals over the age of 40 years may be more commonly affected by patellar tendinitis.

In 28 studies of over 28,000 participants, only about 0.1% of the general population was affected. For athletes under 18 years of age, only about 10% were affected compared to 21.3% over the age of 18.
