= SAC =

SAC or Sac may refer to:

== Organizations ==
=== Arts ===
- Seoul Arts Center, South Korea
- The Society of Arts and Crafts of Boston, US, since 1897
- Songwriters Association of Canada
- Superior Art Creations, a computer art scene group

=== Education ===
- Santa Ana College, California, US
- San Antonio College, Texas, US
- St. Andrew's College, Aurora, Canada
- Students' Administrative Council, University of Toronto, Canada

=== Finance ===
- S.A.C. Capital Advisors, a hedge fund managed by Steven A. Cohen
- Securities Association of China
- Singapore Accountancy Commission

=== Government and military ===
==== China ====
- Second Artillery Corps, later the People's Liberation Army Rocket Force
- Shenyang Aircraft Corporation, Chinese aircraft manufacturer
- Standardization Administration of China
- Securities Association of China

==== India ====
- Southern Air Command (India), of the Indian Air Force
- Space Applications Centre

==== United States ====
- Special Activities Center of the CIA
- California State Prison, Sacramento
- Strategic Air Command, active 1946-1992, now Air Force Global Strike Command
- President's Science Advisory Committee

==== Elsewhere ====
- Satélite Argentino Científico, Argentine research satellites of Comisión Nacional de Actividades Espaciales
- Special advisory committee of the Canadian government
- State Administration Council, junta governing Myanmar after the 2021 coup d'état; known since 2025 as the State Security and Peace Commission
- State Affairs Commission of North Korea
- NATO Strategic Airlift Capability, a multinational transport aircraft initiative

=== Religious organizations ===
- Societas Apostolatus Catholici, a Catholic religious congregation
- Society of the Catholic Apostolate, or Pallotines, a religious order

=== Sports organizations ===
- Sacramento Kings, a National Basketball Association team
- Sooner Athletic Conference
- South Atlantic Conference
- Summit Athletic Conference (IHSAA), Fort Wayne, Indiana, US
- Swiss Alpine Club

=== Trade unions ===
- Central Organisation of the Workers of Sweden (in Swedish: Sveriges Arbetares Centralorganisation, SAC - Syndikalisterna)
- Sveriges Arbetares Centralorganisation, a trade union federation in Sweden

=== Other organizations ===
- Scottish Arbitration Centre
- Service d'Action Civique, a Gaullist militia
- Shakespeare Authorship Coalition, Claremont, California
- Soldiers of Aryan Culture, an American white supremacist prison gang

== Science and technology ==
=== Computing ===
- SA-C programming language
- S.A.C. (control code), in the 1950s FIELDATA
- SAC programming language
- Special Administration Console of Windows Emergency Management Services
- Strict Avalanche Criterion in cryptography
- Selected Areas in Cryptography, an annual cryptography conference
- Symposium on Applied Computing, an annual conference
- Spatial Audio Coding or MPEG Surround

=== Biology and medicine ===
==== Microbiology and biochemistry ====
- SAC (gene)
- S-Allyl cysteine, a chemical constituent of garlic
- Soluble adenylyl cyclase
- Spindle assembly checkpoint, in biology

==== Anatomy ====
- Air sac
- Amniotic sac
- Anal sac or anal gland
- Bursa sac or bursa
- Chorion
- Dural sac, a structure of spinal cord
- Egg sac, the reproductive structure of a spider
- Fecal sac
- Gestational sac
- Greater sac
- Gular skin or throat sac
- Ink sac
- Lacrimal sac, eye-and-nose-associated structure
- Lesser sac
- Ovule or embryo sac
- Pleural cavity or pleural sac
- Synovial sac, a joint component
- Venom sac, in venom-secreting animals
- Vestibular sacs (disambiguation)
- Viscid sac
- Vocal sac
- Yolk sac

==== Other uses in biology and medicine ====
- Sac spider, a taxon
- Source of activation confusion model, in psychology

=== Other uses in science and technology ===
- Tin-silver-copper (SnAgCu), a solder formulation
- Self-adjusting clutch in the BMW 5 Series
- Sports activity coupe, a BMW class of cars
- Supplemental access control, electronic travel document security features
- SAC-46 (handgun), a pistol, US, 1945

== Transportation ==
- Sacramento Executive Airport, US (IATA code)
- Sacramento Valley Rail Station, US (Amtrak station code)
- St Albans City railway station, England (National Rail station code)
- Sports activity coupe, a BMW class of cars
- Self-adjusting clutch in the BMW 5 Series

== Places ==
=== United States ===
- Sac City, Iowa
- Sac County, Iowa
- Sac River, Missouri
- Nickname of Sacramento, California
- Sacramento Executive Airport, US (IATA code)
- Sacramento Valley Rail Station, US (Amtrak station code)
- SISD Student Activities Complex, in El Paso, Texas, US
- Student Activity Complex, in Laredo, Texas, US

=== Other places ===
- St Anne's Cathedral, Belfast
- St Anne's Cathedral, Debrecen
- St Albans City railway station, England (National Rail station code)

== Ranks and occupations ==
- Senior Aircraftman, a Royal Air Force rank
- Senior Assistant Commissioner, a rank in the police of Singapore and Malaysia
- Special Agent in Charge of a criminal investigation

== Other uses ==
- Sač, a baking vessel in the Balkans and the Middle East
- Saj (utensil), spelled sac in Turkish and Azerbaijani
- Saj (bread), spelled sac in Turkish and Azerbaijani
- Sac language (ISO 639:sac)
- Sac (people), a North American tribe
- Sacrifice bunt, in baseball
- School-assessed coursework for Victorian Certificate of Education
- Slow air chamber, of a Native American flute
- Special Area of Conservation, in the EU and UK
- Ghost in the Shell: Stand Alone Complex (and GITS: SAC 2nd GIG), a Japanese TV series

== See also ==
- Sack (disambiguation)
