= Knee =

Leg joint in primates

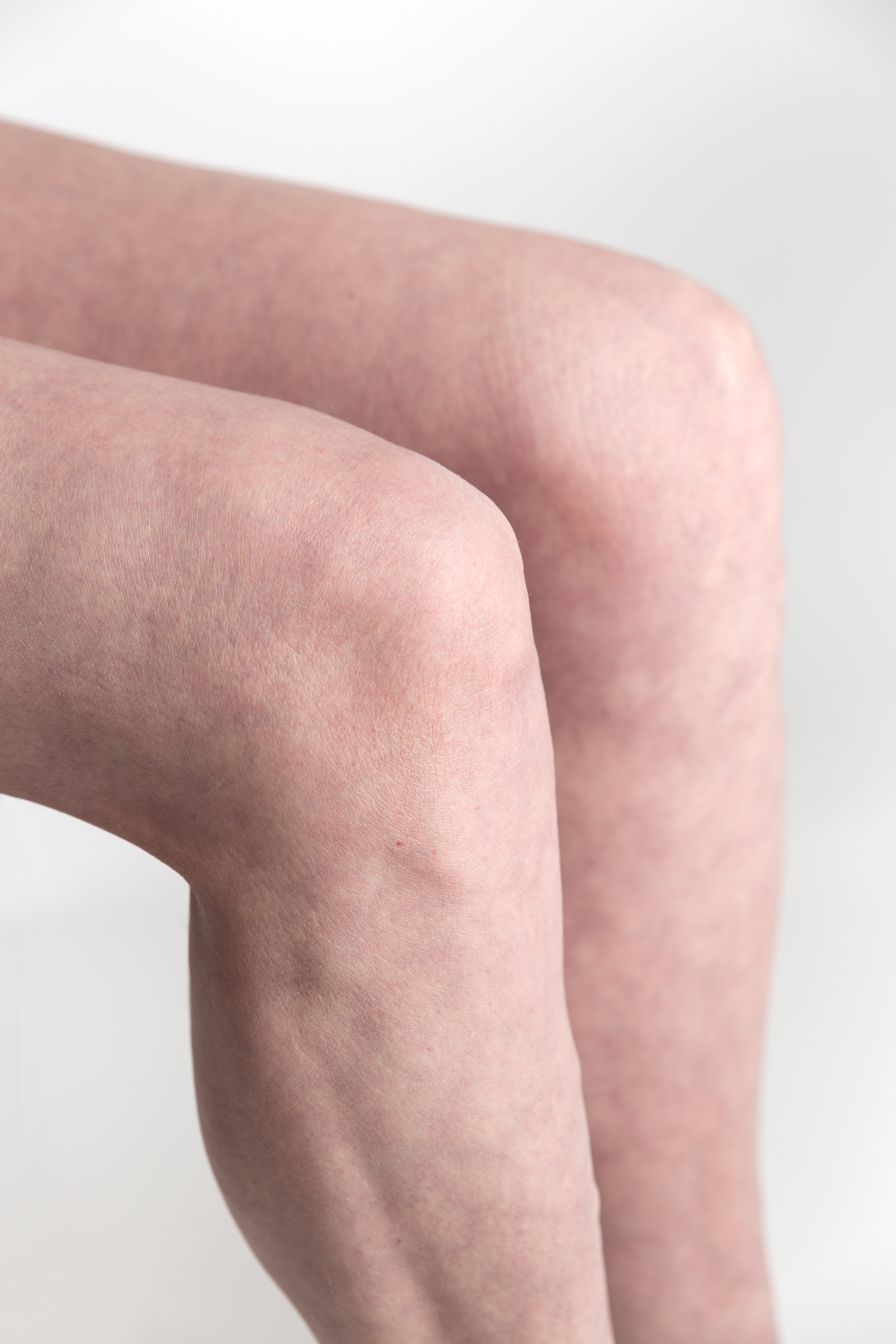
- Human knees

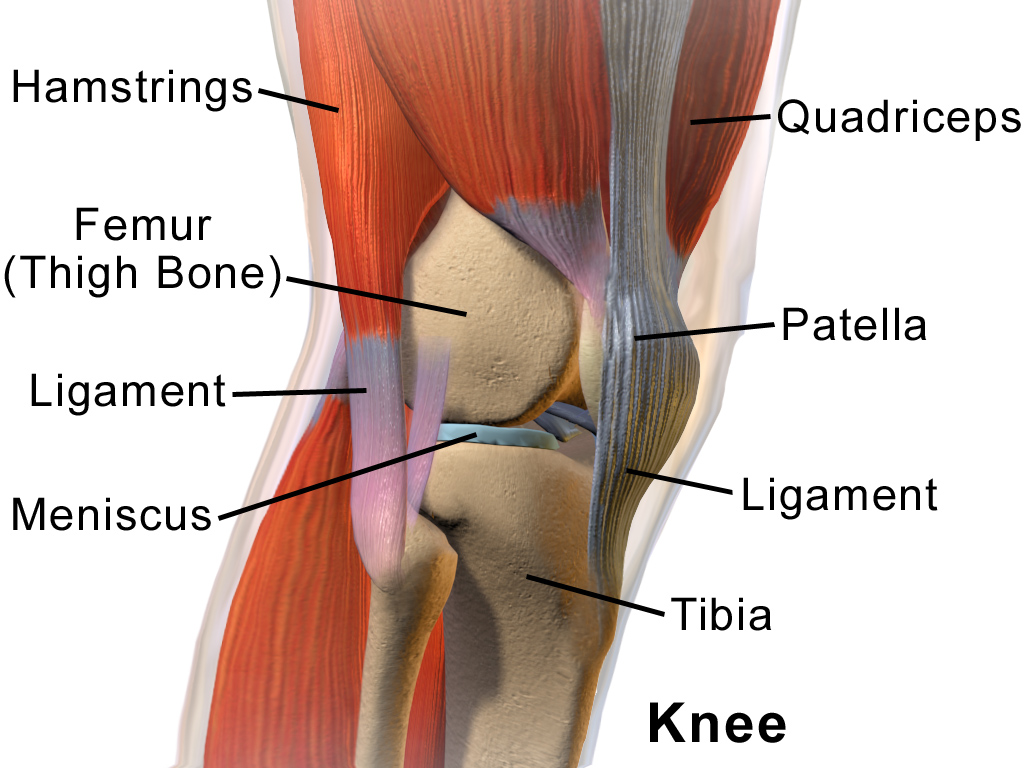
- Right knee (front-right view)

Details
- System: Musculoskeletal system
- Nerve: Femoral, obturator, sciatic

Identifiers
- Latin: articulatio genus
- MeSH: D007717
- TA98: A01.1.00.036
- TA2: 161
- FMA: 24974

In humans and other primates, the knee joins the thigh with the leg and consists of two joints: one between the femur and tibia (tibiofemoral joint), and one between the femur and patella (patellofemoral joint). The knee is a modified hinge joint, which permits flexion and extension as well as slight internal and external rotation. The knee is vulnerable to injury and to the development of osteoarthritis.

It is often termed a compound joint having tibiofemoral and patellofemoral components. (The fibular collateral ligament is often considered with tibiofemoral components.)

== Structure ==
The knee is a modified hinge joint, a type of synovial joint, which is composed of three functional compartments: the patellofemoral articulation, consisting of the patella, or "kneecap", and the patellar groove on the front of the femur through which it slides; and the medial and lateral tibiofemoral articulations linking the femur, or thigh bone, with the tibia, the main bone of the lower leg. The joint is bathed in synovial fluid which is contained inside the synovial membrane called the joint capsule. The posterolateral corner of the knee is an area that has recently been the subject of renewed scrutiny and research.

The knee is the largest joint and one of the most important joints in the body. It plays an essential role in movement related to carrying the body weight in horizontal (running and walking) and vertical (jumping) directions.

At birth, the kneecap is just formed from cartilage, and this will ossify (change to bone) between the ages of three and five years. Because it is the largest sesamoid bone in the human body, the ossification process takes significantly longer.

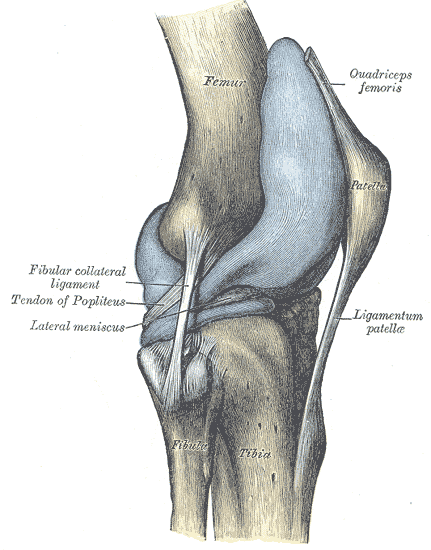
Lateral aspect of right knee

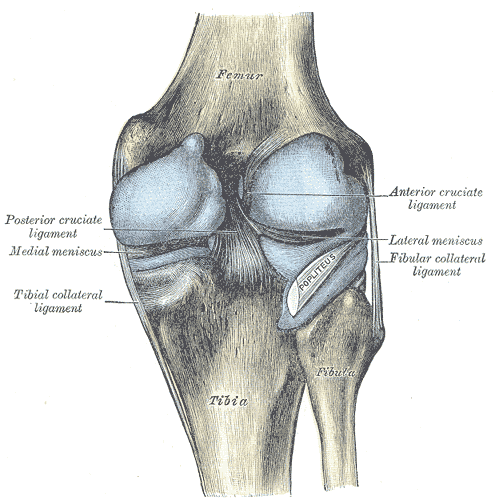
Posterior aspect of right knee

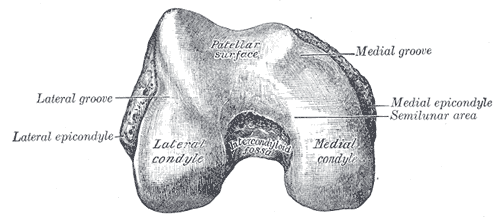
Articular surfaces of femur

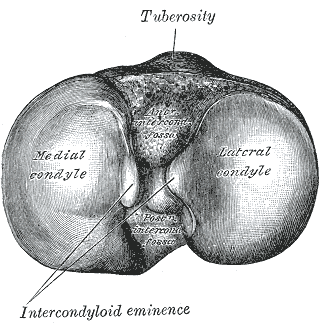
Articular surfaces of tibia

=== Articular bodies ===
The main articular bodies of the femur are its lateral and medial condyles. These diverge slightly distally and posteriorly, with the lateral condyle being wider in front than at the back while the medial condyle is of more constant width. The radius of the condyles' curvature in the sagittal plane becomes smaller toward the back. This diminishing radius produces a series of involute midpoints (i.e. located on a spiral). The resulting series of transverse axes permit the sliding and rolling motion in the flexing knee while ensuring the collateral ligaments are sufficiently lax to permit the rotation associated with the curvature of the medial condyle about a vertical axis.

The pair of tibial condyles are separated by the intercondylar eminence composed of a lateral and a medial tubercle.

The patella also serves an articular body, and its posterior surface is referred to as the trochlea of the knee. It is inserted into the thin anterior wall of the joint capsule. On its posterior surface is a lateral and a medial articular surface, both of which communicate with the patellar surface which unites the two femoral condyles on the anterior side of the bone's distal end.

=== Articular capsule ===
The articular capsule has a synovial and a fibrous membrane separated by fatty deposits. Anteriorly, the synovial membrane is attached on the margin of the cartilage both on the femur and the tibia, but on the femur, it communicates with the suprapatellar bursa or recess and extends the joint space proximally. The suprapatellar bursa is prevented from being pinched during extension by the articularis genus muscle. Behind, the synovial membrane is attached to the margins of the two femoral condyles which produces two extensions (semimembranosus bursa under medial head of the gastrocnemius and popliteal bursa under lateral head of the gastrocnemius) similar to the suprapatellar bursa. Between these two extensions, the synovial membrane passes in front of the two cruciate ligaments at the center of the joint, thus forming a pocket direct inward.

Synovium lining the capsule and its bursae. The synovium also lines infrapatellar fat pad, the fat pad that lies below the ligamentum patellae. Synovium projecting into the fat pad as two foldings.

=== Nerves ===
From an anterior perspective, the superolateral quadrant of the knee is innervated by the nerves to the vastus lateralis and vastus intermedius, the sciatic nerve, and by the superior lateral genicular and common fibular nerves; in the inferolateral quadrant, the inferior lateral genicular nerve and recurrent fibular nerves predominate; the superomedial quadrant is innervated by the nerves to the vastus medialis and vastus intermedius, the obturator and sciatic nerves, and by the superior medial genicular nerve; and the inferomedial quadrant has innervation by the inferior medial genicular nerve and the infrapatellar branch of the saphenous nerve.

The articular branches from the obturator and tibial nerves supply the posterior knee capsule, with additional supply from the common fibular nerve and sciatic nerve; the tibial nerve innervates the entire posterior capsule; the posterior division of the obturator nerve and the tibial nerve supply the superomedial aspect of the posterior capsule; the superolateral aspect of the posterior capsule is innervated by the tibial nerve, and by the common fibular and sciatic nerves.

=== Bursae ===
Numerous bursae surround the knee joint. The largest communicative bursa is the suprapatellar bursa described above. Four considerably smaller bursae are located on the back of the knee. Two non-communicative bursae are located in front of the patella and below the patellar tendon, and others are sometimes present.

=== Cartilage ===
Cartilage is a thin, elastic tissue that protects the bone and makes certain that the joint surfaces can slide easily over each other. Cartilage ensures supple knee movement. There are two types of joint cartilage in the knees: fibrous cartilage (the meniscus) and hyaline cartilage. Fibrous cartilage has tensile strength and can resist pressure. Hyaline cartilage covers the surface along which the joints move. Collagen fibres within the articular cartilage have been described by Benninghoff as arising from the subchondral bone in a radial manner, building so called Gothic arches. On the surface of the cartilage, these fibres appear in a tangential orientation and increase the abrasion resistance. There are no blood vessels inside of the hyaline cartilage, the alimentation is performed per diffusion. Synovial fluid and the subchondral bone marrow serve both as nutrition sources for the hyaline cartilage. Lack of at least one source induces a degeneration. Cartilage will wear over the years. Cartilage has a very limited capacity for self-restoration. The newly formed tissue will generally consist of a large part of fibrous cartilage of lesser quality than the original hyaline cartilage. As a result, new cracks and tears will form in the cartilage over time.

=== Menisci ===
The articular disks of the knee-joint are called menisci because they only partly divide the joint space. These two disks, the medial meniscus and the lateral meniscus, consist of connective tissue with extensive collagen fibers containing cartilage-like cells. Strong fibers run along the menisci from one attachment to the other, while weaker radial fibers are interlaced with the former. The menisci are flattened at the center of the knee joint, fused with the synovial membrane laterally, and can move over the tibial surface. The upper and lower surfaces of the menisci are free. Each meniscus has anterior and posterior horns that meet in the intercondylar area of the tibia.

Medial meniscus is bigger, less curved, and thinner. Its posterior horn is thicker (14mm) than the anterior horn (6mm).

The lateral meniscus is smaller, more curved (nearly circular), and has more uniform thickness than medial meniscus (10mm). The lateral meniscus is less attached to the joint capsule, because its posterolateral surface is grooved by the popliteus tendon, separating the meniscus from the capsule. The popliteus tendon is not attached to the lateral meniscus.

=== Ligaments ===
Anterolateral aspect of right knee

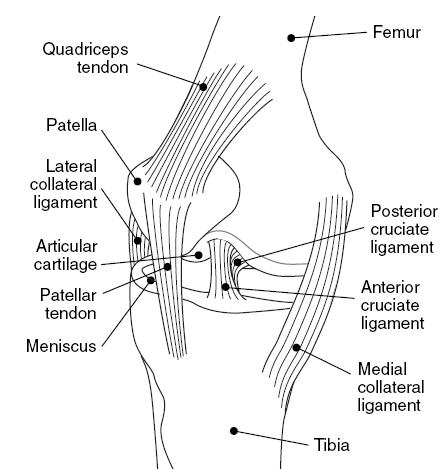
Anteromedial aspect of right knee

The ligaments surrounding the knee joint offer stability by limiting movements and, together with the menisci and several bursae, protect the articular capsule.

==== Intracapsular ====
The knee is stabilized by a pair of cruciate ligaments. These ligaments are both extrasynovial, intracapsular ligaments. The anterior cruciate ligament (ACL) stretches from the lateral condyle of femur to the anterior intercondylar area. The ACL prevents the tibia from being pushed too far anterior relative to the femur. It is often torn during twisting or bending of the knee. The posterior cruciate ligament (PCL) stretches from medial condyle of femur to the posterior intercondylar area. This ligament prevents posterior displacement of the tibia relative to the femur. Injury to this ligament is uncommon but can occur as a direct result of forced trauma to the ligament.

The transverse ligament stretches from the lateral meniscus to the medial meniscus. It passes in front of the menisci. It is divided into several strips in 10% of cases. The two menisci are attached to each other anteriorly by the ligament. The posterior (of Wrisberg) and anterior meniscofemoral ligaments (of Humphrey) stretch from the posterior horn of the lateral meniscus to the medial femoral condyle. They pass anterior and posterior to the posterior cruciate ligament respectively. The meniscotibial ligaments (or "coronary") stretches from inferior edges of the menisci to the periphery of the tibial plateaus.

==== Extracapsular ====
The patellar ligament connects the patella to the tuberosity of the tibia. It is also occasionally called the patellar tendon because there is no definite separation between the quadriceps tendon (which surrounds the patella) and the area connecting the patella to the tibia. This very strong ligament helps give the patella its mechanical leverage and also functions as a cap for the condyles of the femur. Laterally and medially to the patellar ligament, the lateral and medial retinacula connect fibers from the vasti lateralis and medialis muscles to the tibia. Some fibers from the iliotibial tract radiate into the lateral retinaculum and the medial retinaculum receives some transverse fibers arising on the medial femoral epicondyle.

The medial collateral ligament (MCL a.k.a. "tibial") stretches from the medial epicondyle of the femur to the medial tibial condyle. It is composed of three groups of fibers, one stretching between the two bones, and two fused with the medial meniscus. The MCL is partly covered by the pes anserinus and the tendon of the semimembranosus passes under it. It protects the medial side of the knee from being bent open by a stress applied to the lateral side of the knee (a valgus force).

The lateral collateral ligament (LCL a.k.a. "fibular") stretches from the lateral epicondyle of the femur to the head of fibula. It is separate from both the joint capsule and the lateral meniscus. It protects the lateral side from an inside bending force (a varus force). The anterolateral ligament (ALL) is situated in front of the LCL.

Lastly, there are two ligaments on the dorsal side of the knee. The oblique popliteal ligament is a radiation of the tendon of the semimembranosus on the medial side, from where it is direct laterally and proximally. The arcuate popliteal ligament originates on the apex of the head of the fibula to stretch proximally, crosses the tendon of the popliteus muscle, and passes into the capsule.

== Muscles ==
Most muscles responsible for the movement of the knee joint belong to either the anterior, medial or posterior compartment of the thigh. The extensors generally belong to the anterior compartment and the flexors to the posterior. The two exceptions to this are gracilis, a flexor, which belongs to the medial compartment and sartorius, a flexor, in the anterior compartment. Additionally, some muscles in the lower leg provide weak knee flexion, namely the gastrocnemius, in addition to their primary function of moving the foot.

=== Extensors ===
Muscle	Origin	Insertion	Artery	Nerve	Action	Antagonist
Articularis genus	Distal end of anterior femoral shaft	Proximal extension of the joint capsule of the knee	Femoral artery	Femoral nerve	Pulling the suprapatellar bursa during extension of the knee	
Quadriceps femoris	Combined rectus femoris and vastus muscles	Patella and tibial tuberosity via the Patellar ligament	Femoral artery	Femoral nerve	Extension of the knee; flexion of the hip (rectus femoris only)	Hamstring
Rectus femoris	Anterior inferior iliac spine and the exterior surface of the bony ridge which forms the iliac portion of the acetabulum	Patella and tibial tuberosity via the Patellar ligament	Femoral artery	Femoral nerve	Extension of the knee; flexion of the hip	Hamstring
Vastus lateralis	Greater trochanter, intertrochanteric line, and linea aspera of the femur	Patella and tibial tuberosity via the patellar ligament	Femoral artery	Femoral nerve	Extends and stabilizes knee	Hamstring
Vastus intermedius	Antero/lateral femur	Patella and tibial tuberosity via the patellar ligament	Femoral artery	Femoral nerve	Extension of the knee	Hamstring
Vastus medialis	Femur	Patella and tibial tuberosity via the patellar ligament	Femoral artery	Femoral nerve	Extension of the knee	Hamstring

=== Flexors ===
Posterior compartment

Muscle	Origin	Insertion	Artery	Nerve	Action	Antagonist
Sartorius	Anterior superior iliac spine	Pes anserinus	superficial circumflex iliac artery, lateral femoral artery, deep femoral artery, descending geniculate artery, femoral artery	femoral nerve	hip joint: flexion, lateral rotation and abduction. Knee joint: flexion and medial rotation	Quadriceps muscle (partly)
Biceps femoris	Long head: tuberosity of the ischium, short head: linea aspera on the femur	The head of the fibula which articulates with the back of the lateral tibial condyle	Inferior gluteal artery, perforating arteries, popliteal artery	Long head: medial (tibial) part of sciatic nerve, short head: lateral (common fibular) part of sciatic nerve	Flexion of knee, laterally rotates leg at knee (when knee is flexed), extends hip joint (long head only)	Quadriceps muscle
Semitendinosus	Tuberosity of the ischium	Pes anserinus	Inferior gluteal artery, perforating arteries	Sciatic (tibial, L5, S1, S2)	Flexes knee, extends hip joint, medially rotates leg at knee	Quadriceps muscle
Semimembranosus	Tuberosity of the ischium	Medial surface of tibia	Profunda femoris, gluteal artery	Sciatic nerve	Flexes knee, extends hip joint, medially rotates leg at knee	Quadriceps muscle
Gastrocnemius	Medial and lateral condyle of the femur	Calcaneus	Sural arteries	Tibial nerve from the sciatic, specifically, nerve roots S1, S2	Minor flexion of knee and plantarflexion	Tibialis anterior muscle
Plantaris	Lateral supracondylar ridge of femur above lateral head of gastrocnemius	Tendo calcaneus (medial side, deep to gastrocnemius tendon)	Sural arteries	Tibial nerve	Flexes knee and plantar flexes foot	Tibialis anterior muscle
Popliteus	Middle facet of the lateral surface of the lateral femoral condyle	Posterior tibia under the tibial condyles	Popliteal artery	Tibial nerve	Medial rotation and flexion of knee	

Medial compartment:

Muscle	Origin	Insertion	Artery	Nerve	Action	Antagonist
Gracilis	Inferior pubic ramus	Pes anserinus	Obturator artery	Anterior branch of obturator nerve	Flexion and medial rotation of knee; adduction of hip, flexion of hip,	

=== Blood supply ===
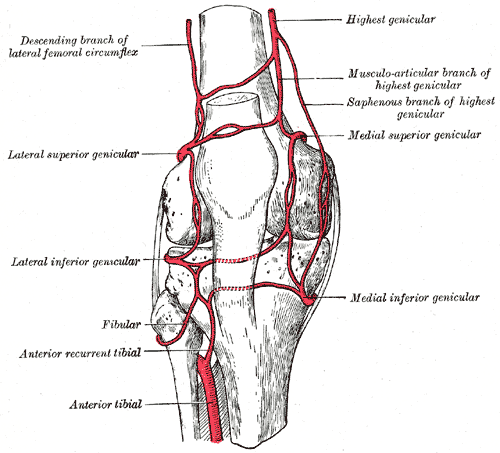
Arteries of the knee

The femoral artery and the popliteal artery help form the arterial network or plexus, surrounding the knee joint. There are six main branches: two superior genicular arteries, two inferior genicular arteries, the descending genicular artery and the recurrent branch of anterior tibial artery.

The medial genicular arteries penetrate the knee joint.

== Function ==
The knee permits flexion and extension about a virtual transverse axis, as well as a slight medial and lateral rotation about the axis of the lower leg in the flexed position. The knee joint is called "mobile" because the femur and lateral meniscus move over the tibia during rotation, while the femur rolls and glides over both menisci during extension-flexion.

The center of the transverse axis of the extension/flexion movements is located where both collateral ligaments and both cruciate ligaments intersect. This center moves upward and backward during flexion, while the distance between the center and the articular surfaces of the femur changes dynamically with the decreasing curvature of the femoral condyles. The total range of motion is dependent on several parameters such as soft-tissue restraints, active insufficiency, and hamstring tightness.

Maximum movements and muscles
Extension 5–10°	Flexion 120–150°
Quadriceps (with some assistance from the Tensor fasciae latae)	(In order of importance); Semimembranosus; Semitendinosus; Biceps femoris Gracilis; Sartorius; Popliteus; Gastrocnemius
Internal rotation* 10°	External rotation* 30–40°
(In order of importance); Semimembranosus; Semitendinosus; Gracilis; Sartorius; Popliteus	Biceps femoris
*(knee flexed 90°)

=== Extended position ===
With the knee extended, both the lateral and medial collateral ligaments, as well as the anterior part of the anterior cruciate ligament, are taut. During extension, the femoral condyles glide and roll into a position which causes the complete unfolding of the tibial collateral ligament. During the last 10° of extension, an obligatory terminal rotation is triggered in which the knee is rotated medially 5°. The final rotation is produced by a lateral rotation of the tibia in the non-weight-bearing leg, and by a medial rotation of the femur in the weight-bearing leg. This terminal rotation is made possible by the shape of the medial femoral condyle, assisted by contraction of the popliteus muscle and the iliotibial tract and is caused by the stretching of the anterior cruciate ligament. Both cruciate ligaments are slightly unwound and both lateral ligaments become taut.

=== Flexed position ===
In the flexed position, the collateral ligaments are relaxed while the cruciate ligaments are taut. Rotation is controlled by the twisted cruciate ligaments; the two ligaments get twisted around each other during medial rotation of the tibia—which reduces the amount of rotation possible—while they become unwound during lateral rotation of the tibia. Because of the oblique position of the cruciate ligaments, at least a part of one of them is always tense and these ligaments control the joint as the collateral ligaments are relaxed. Furthermore, the dorsal fibers of the tibial collateral ligament become tensed during extreme medial rotation and the ligament also reduces the lateral rotation to 45–60°.

== Clinical significance ==
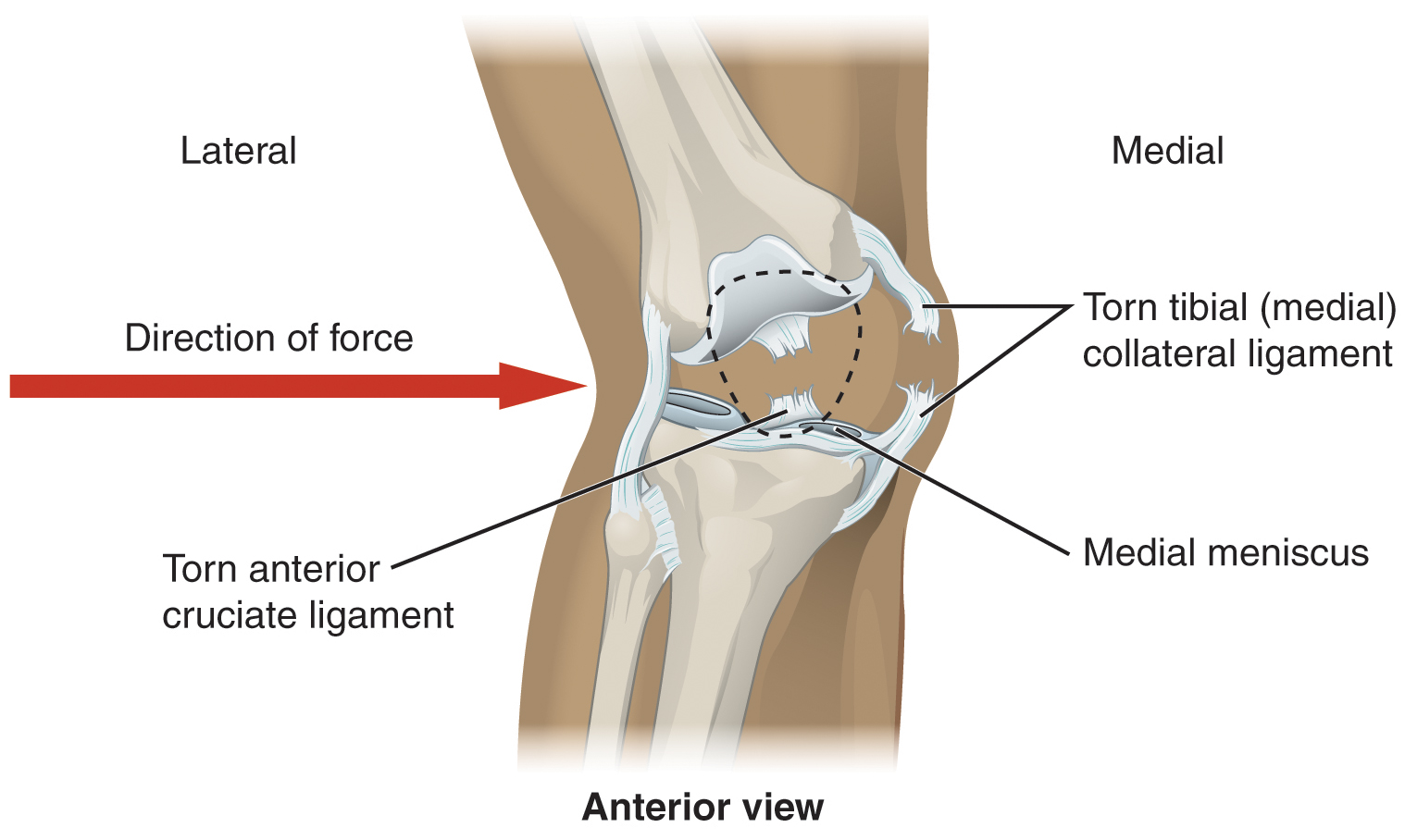
Lateral trauma to the knee can tear the medial collateral ligament, anterior cruciate ligament, and medial meniscus

Knee pain is caused by trauma, misalignment, degeneration, and conditions producing arthritis. The most common knee disorder is generally known as patellofemoral syndrome. The majority of minor cases of knee pain can be treated at home with rest and ice, but more serious injuries may require surgical care.

One form of patellofemoral syndrome involves a tissue-related problem that creates pressure and irritation in the knee between the patella and the trochlea (patellar compression syndrome), which causes pain. The second major class of knee disorder involves a tear, slippage, or dislocation that impairs the structural ability of the knee to balance the leg (patellofemoral instability syndrome). Patellofemoral instability syndrome may cause either pain, a sense of poor balance, or both.

Prepatellar bursitis, also known as housemaid's knee, is painful inflammation of the prepatellar bursa (a frontal knee bursa) often brought about by occupational activity such as roofing.

Age also contributes to disorders of the knee. In older people, knee pain frequently arises due to osteoarthritis. In addition, weakening of tissues around the knee may contribute to the problem. Patellofemoral instability may relate to hip abnormalities or to tightness of surrounding ligaments.

Cartilage lesions can be caused by:

- Accidents (fractures)
- Injuries
- The removal of a meniscus
- Anterior cruciate ligament injury
- Posterior cruciate ligament injury
- Posterolateral corner injury
- Medial knee injuries
- Considerable strain on the knee.

Excessive stress can be detrimental to cartilage. This is especially the case in professions in which people frequently have to walk, lift, or squat. Other causes of pain may be excessive on, and wear off, the knees, in combination with such things as muscle weakness and obesity.

Common complaints:

- A painful, blocked, locked or swollen knee.
- Sufferers sometimes feel as if their knees are about to give way, or may feel uncertain about their movement.

=== Overall fitness and knee injury ===
Physical fitness is related integrally to the development of knee problems. The same activity such as climbing stairs may cause pain from patellofemoral compression for someone who is physically unfit, but not for someone else (or even for that person at a different time). Obesity and excessive bodyweight is another major contributor to knee pain, as forces on the knee joint from daily activities scale with increased bodyweight.

=== Common injuries due to physical activity ===
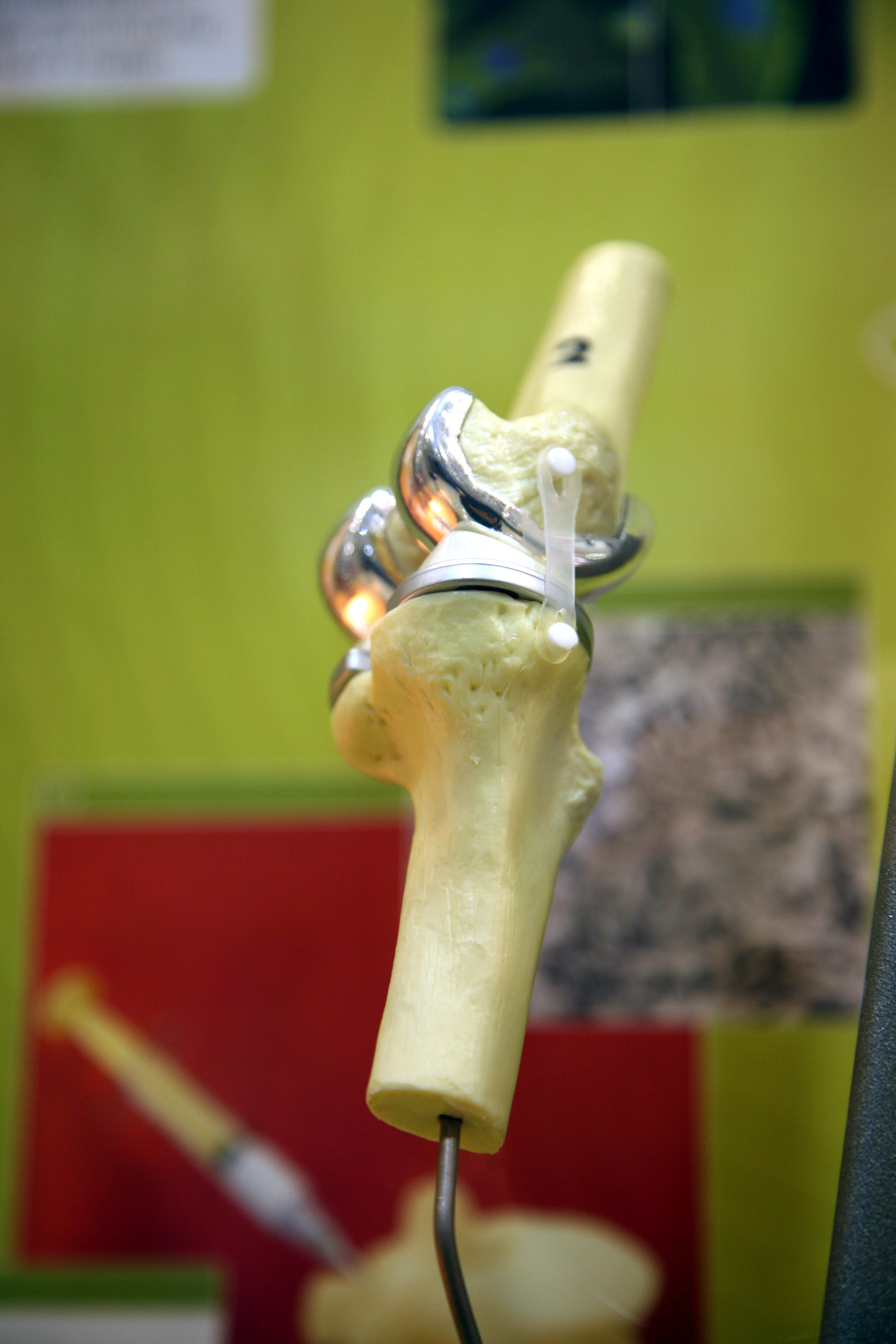
Model demonstrating parts of an artificial knee

In sports that place great pressure on the knees, especially with twisting forces, it is common to tear one or more ligaments or cartilages. Some of the most common knee injuries are those to the medial side: medial knee injuries.

=== Anterior cruciate ligament injury ===
The anterior cruciate ligament is the most commonly injured ligament of the knee. The injury is common during sports. Twisting of the knee is a common cause of over-stretching or tearing the ACL. When the ACL is injured a popping sound may be heard, and the leg may suddenly give out. Besides swelling and pain, walking may be painful and the knee will feel unstable. Minor tears of the anterior cruciate ligament may heal over time, but a torn ACL requires surgery. After surgery, recovery is prolonged and low impact exercises are recommended to strengthen the joint.

=== Torn meniscus injury ===
The menisci act as shock absorbers and separate the two ends of bone in the knee joint. There are two menisci in the knee, the medial (inner) and the lateral (outer). When there is torn cartilage, it means that the meniscus has been injured. Meniscus tears occur during sports often when the knee is twisted. Menisci injury may be innocuous and one may be able to walk after a tear, but soon swelling and pain set in. Sometimes the knee will lock while bending. Pain often occurs when one squats. Small meniscus tears are treated conservatively but most large tears require surgery.

=== Fractures ===
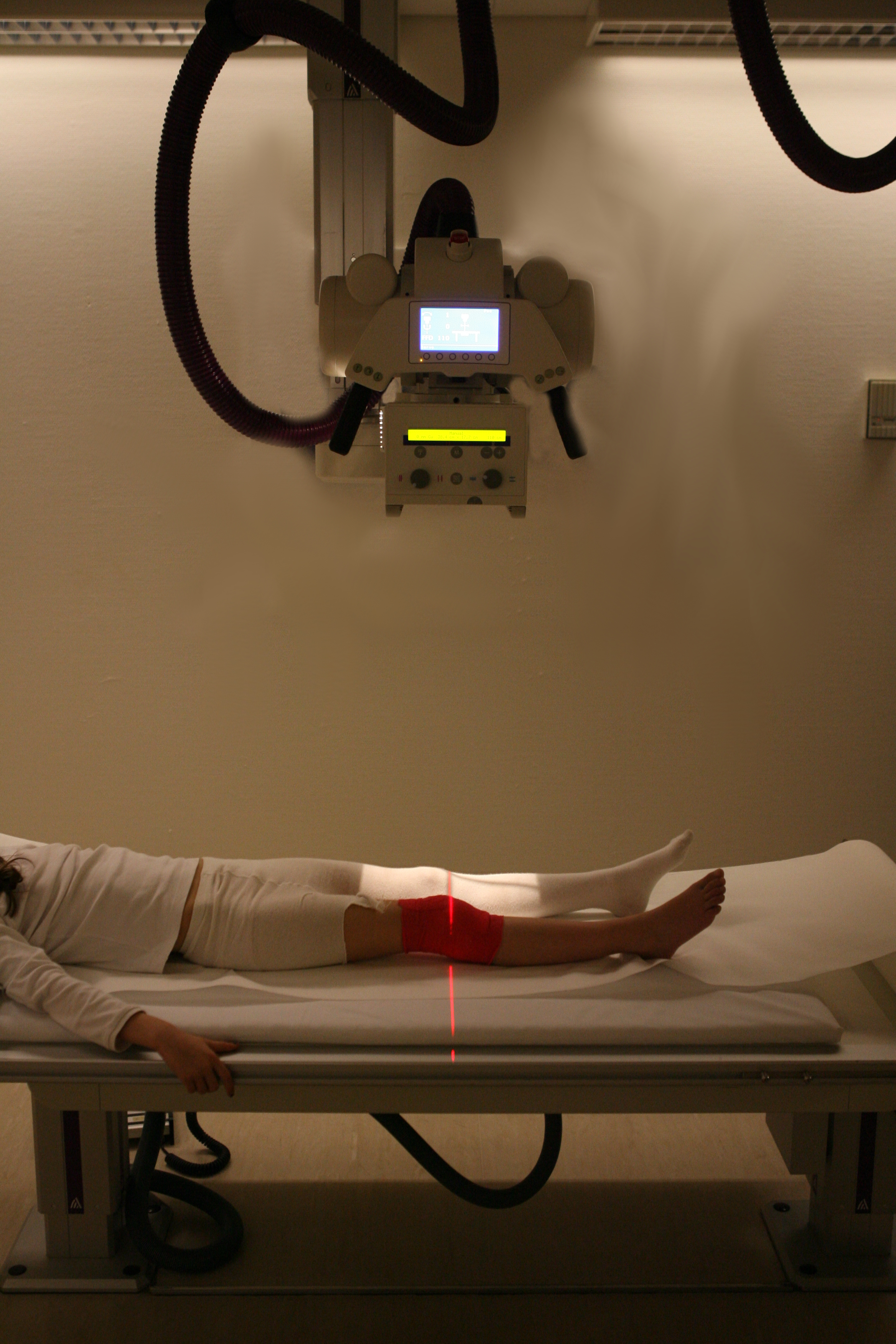
Radiography to examine possible fractures after a knee injury

Knee fractures are rare but do occur, especially as a result of a road accident. Knee fractures include a patella fracture, and a type of avulsion fracture called a Segond fracture. There is usually immediate pain and swelling, and a difficulty or inability to stand on the leg. The muscles go into spasm and even the slightest movements are painful. X-rays can easily confirm the injury and surgery will depend on the degree of displacement and type of fracture.

=== Ruptured tendon ===
Tendons usually attach muscle to bone. In the knee the quadriceps and patellar tendon can sometimes tear. The injuries to these tendons occur when there is forceful contraction of the knee. If the tendon is completely torn, bending or extending the leg is impossible. A completely torn tendon requires surgery but a partially torn tendon can be treated with leg immobilization followed by physical therapy.

=== Overuse ===
Overuse injuries of the knee include tendonitis, bursitis, muscle strains, and iliotibial band syndrome. These injuries often develop slowly over weeks or months. Activities that induce pain usually delay healing. Rest, ice and compression do help in most cases. Once the swelling has diminished, heat packs can increase blood supply and promote healing. Most overuse injuries subside with time but can flare up if the activities are quickly resumed. Individuals may reduce the chances of overuse injuries by warming up prior to exercise, by limiting high impact activities and keep their weight under control.

=== Varus or valgus deformity ===
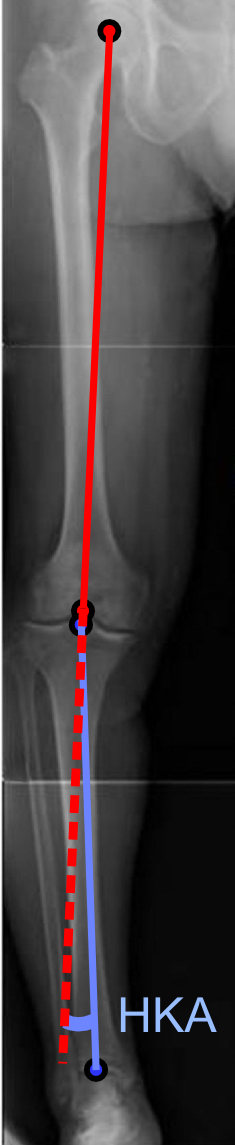
Hip-knee-ankle angle.

There are two disorders relating to an abnormal angle in the coronal plane at the level of the knee:

- Genu valgum is a valgus deformity in which the tibia is turned outward in relation to the femur, resulting in a knock-kneed appearance.
- Genu varum is a varus deformity in which the tibia is turned inward in relation to the femur, resulting in a bowlegged deformity.

The degree of varus or valgus deformity can be quantified by the hip-knee-ankle angle, which is an angle between the femoral mechanical axis and the center of the ankle joint. It is normally between 1.0° and 1.5° of varus in adults. Normal ranges are different in children.

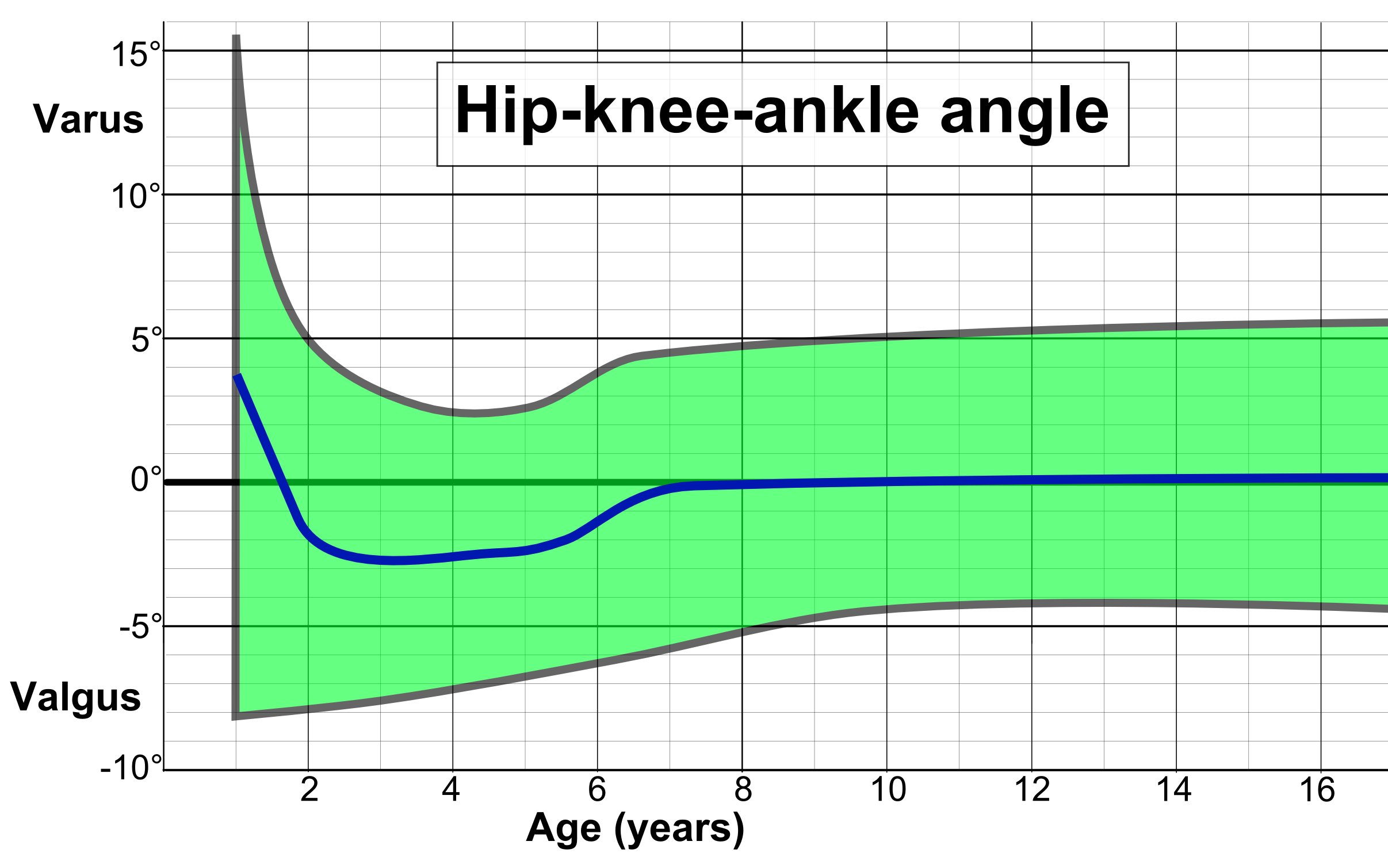
Hip-knee-ankle angle by age, with 95% prediction interval.

=== Chronic pain from osteoarthritis ===
Knee osteoarthritis is a major cause of pain and disability worldwide, with prevalence estimated at 4% of the population, particularly among the elderly. Radiofrequency ablation of certain knee nerves is an outpatient procedure to reduce chronic arthritic pain. Using radiofrequency energy delivered via small electrodes positioned at target genicular nerves, the treatment achieves partial sensory denervation of the joint capsule. Despite the extensive innervation of the knee, specifically targeting the superior lateral, superior medial, and inferior medial genicular nerves has proved to be an effective ablation method for reducing chronic knee pain. In clinical research, such treatment has been shown to produce about 50% less knee pain for up to two years after the procedure.

=== Surgical interventions ===
Before the advent of arthroscopy and arthroscopic surgery, patients having surgery for a torn ACL required at least nine months of rehabilitation, having initially spent several weeks in a full-length plaster cast. With current techniques, such patients may be walking without crutches in two weeks, and playing some sports in a few months.

In addition to developing new surgical procedures, ongoing research is looking into underlying problems which may increase the likelihood of an athlete suffering a severe knee injury. These findings may lead to effective preventive measures, especially in female athletes, who have been shown to be especially vulnerable to ACL tears from relatively minor trauma.

Articular cartilage repair treatment:

- Arthroscopic debridement of the knee (arthroscopic lavage)
- Mosaïc-plasty
- Microfracture (Ice-picking)
- Autologous chondrocyte implantation
- Osteochondral Autograft and Allografts
- PLC Reconstruction

== Imaging ==
=== MRI ===
Both anterior cruciate ligament (ACL) and posterior cruciate ligaments (PCL) are hypointense on both T1 and T2 weighted images of MRI. However, some high signal striations are often seen at the distal part of the ACL, making ACL higher intensity than PCL on MRI scans.

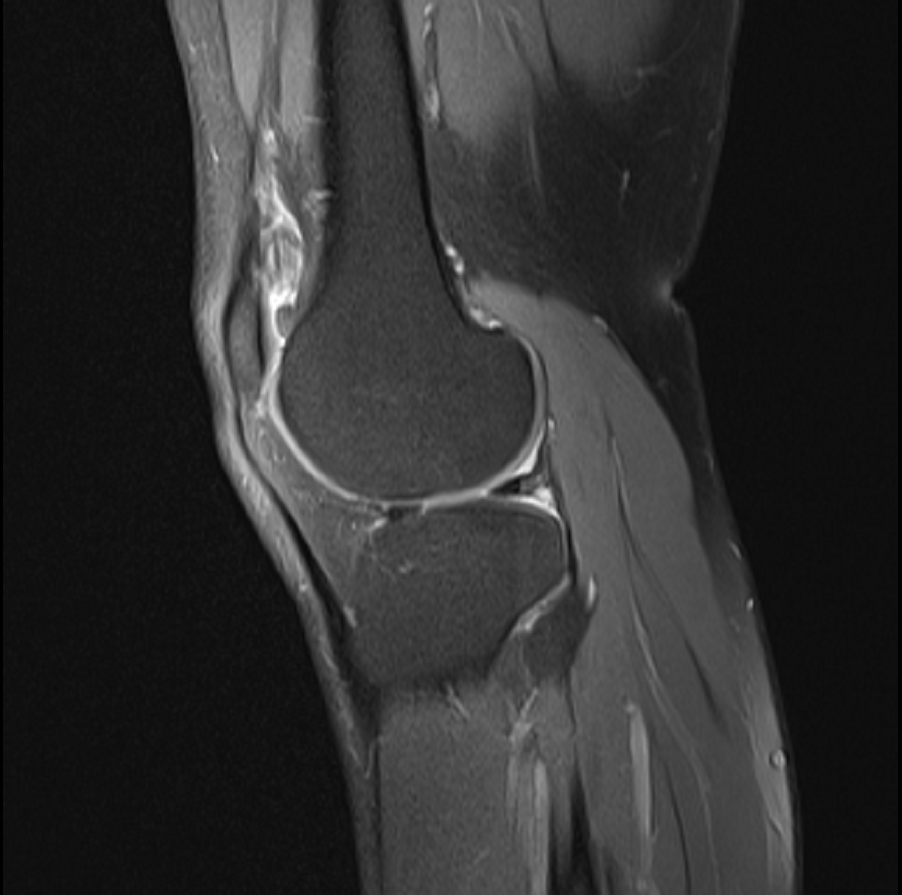
Knee MRI (PD TSE FS sagittal)

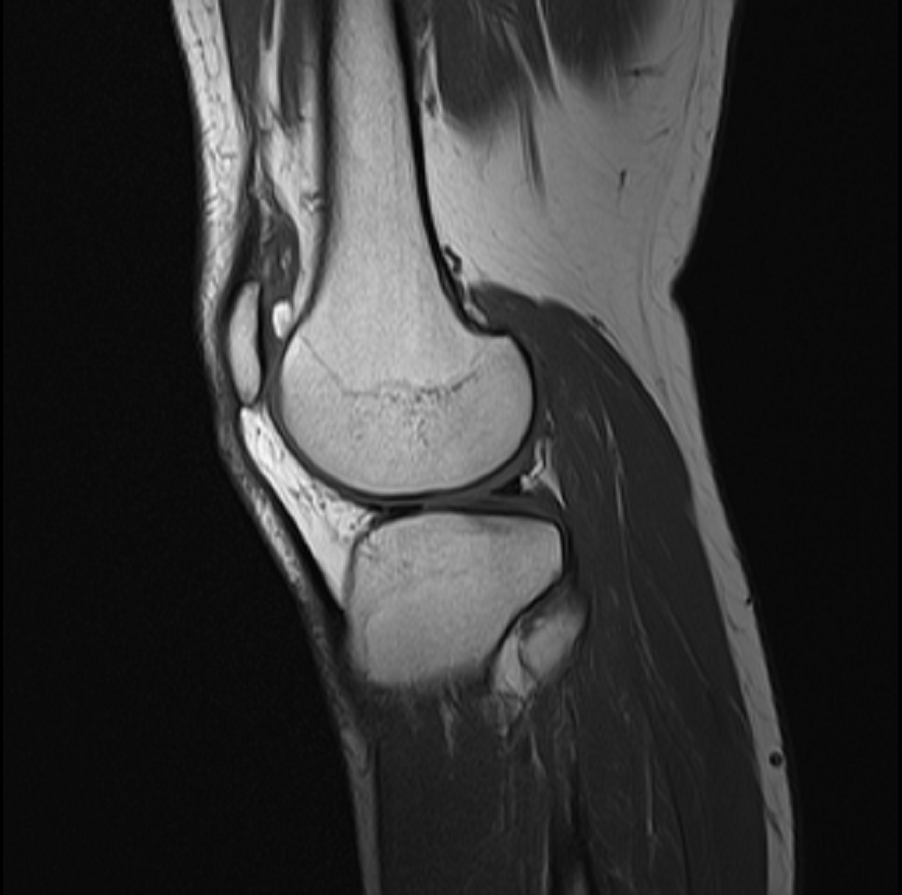
Knee MRI (T1 TSE sagittal)

Knee MRI (sagittal TSE FS)

Knee MRI (sagittal T1 TSE)

Knee MRI (coronal T2 TSE FS)

Knee MRI (traverse PD TSE FS)

Knee MRI osteoarthritis (sagittal TSE FS)

Knee MRI osteoarthritis (sagittal T1 TSE)

Knee MRI osteoarthritis (coronal T2 TSE FS)

Knee MRI osteoarthritis (traverse PD TSE FS)

Real-time MRI- Knee

Knee MR

=== X-ray ===
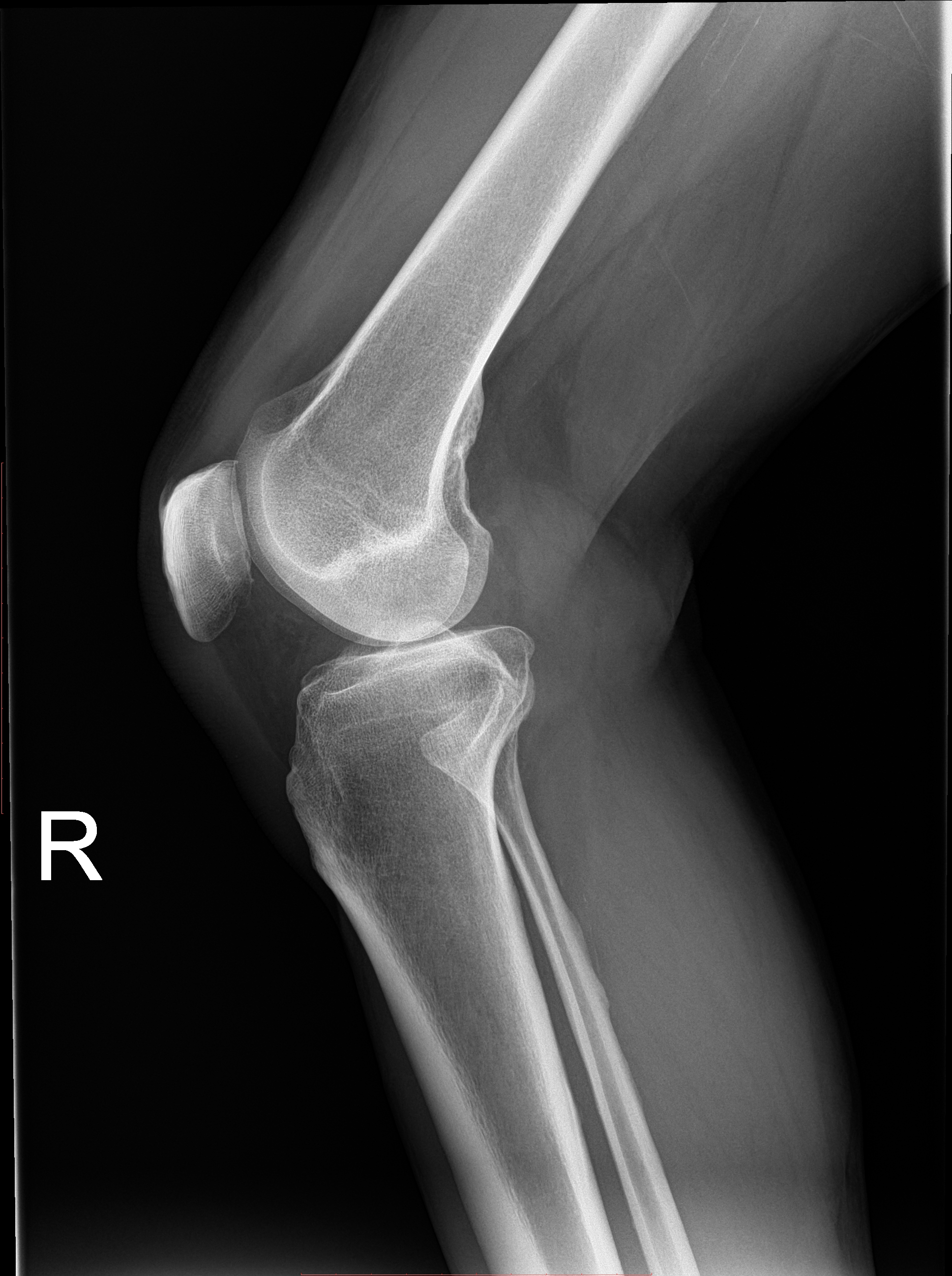
Knee X-ray

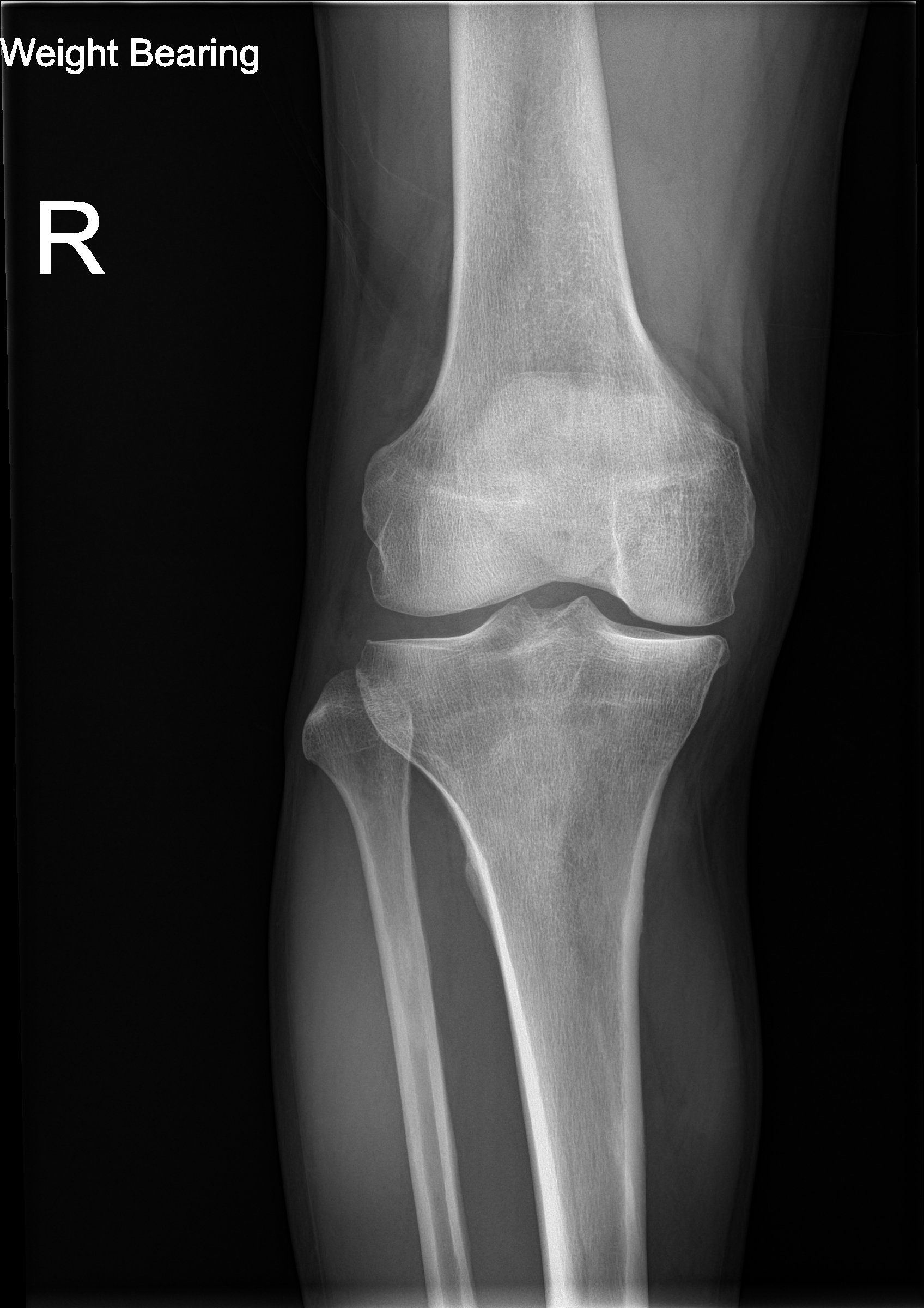
Knee X-ray (weight bearing)

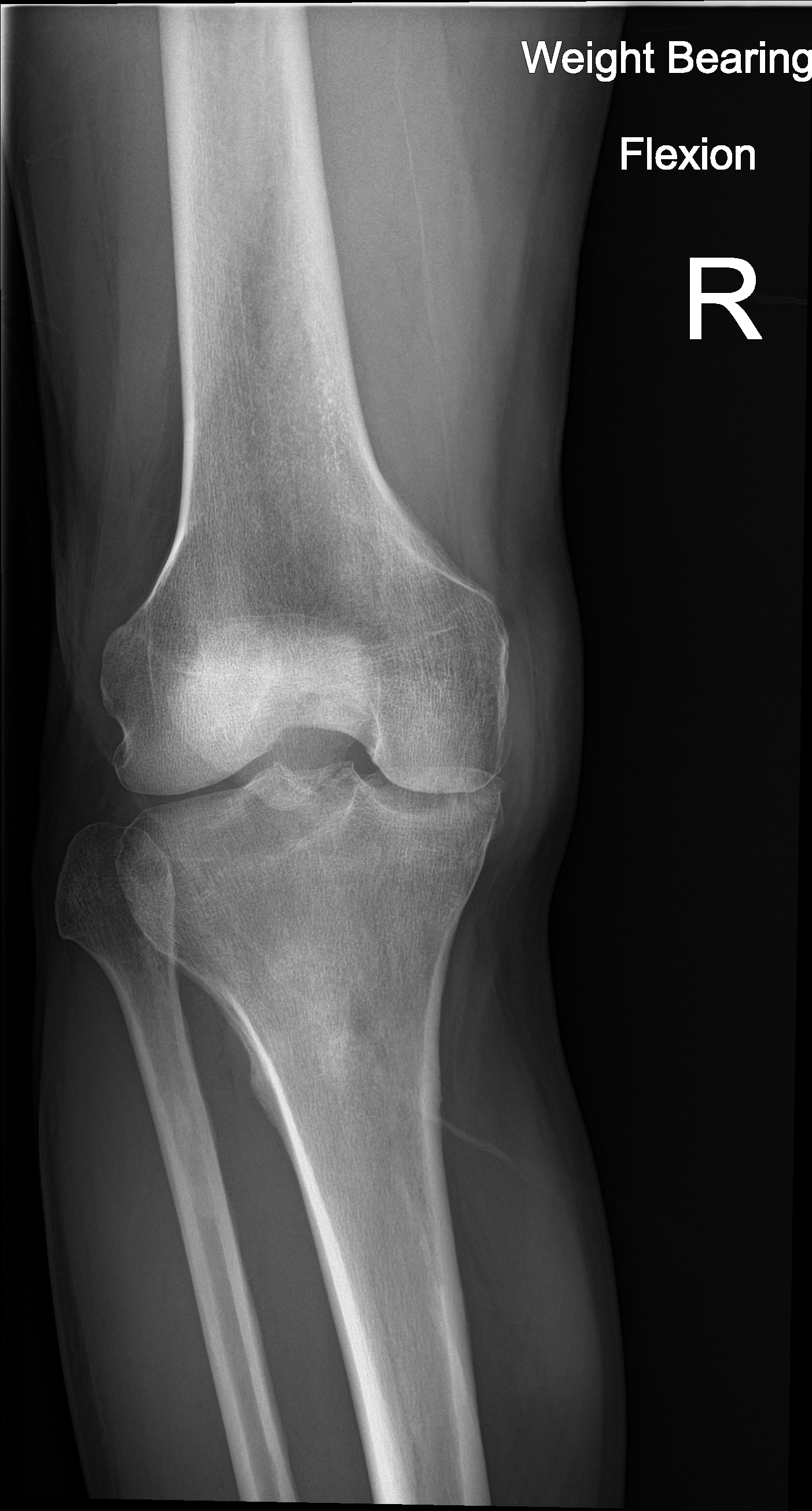
Knee X-ray (weight bearing, flexion)

=== Illustrations ===
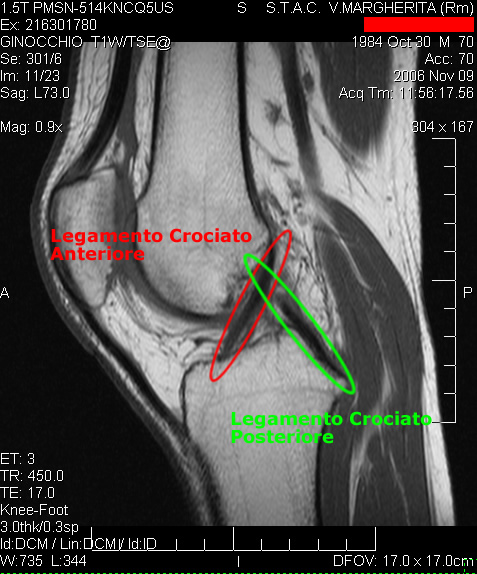
Cruciate ligaments

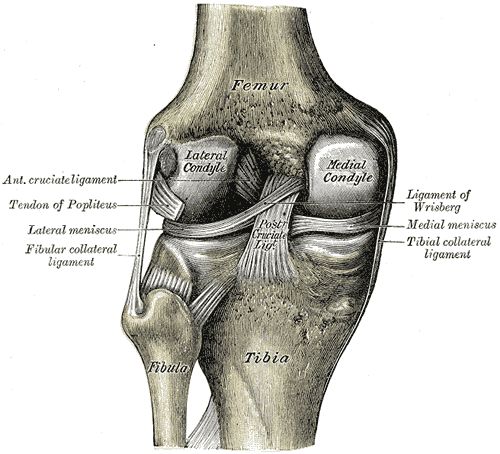
Left knee-joint from behind, showing interior ligaments.

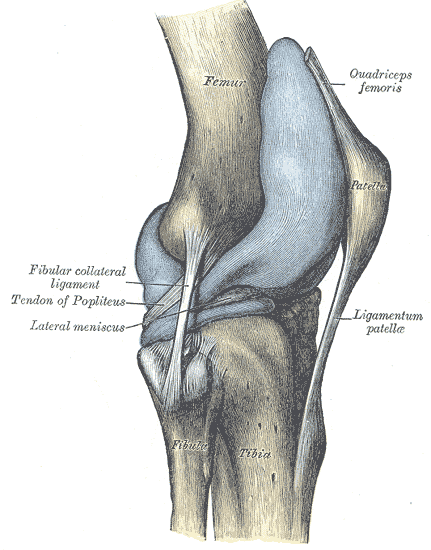
Capsule of right knee-joint (distended). Lateral aspect.

Anterior and lateral view of knee.

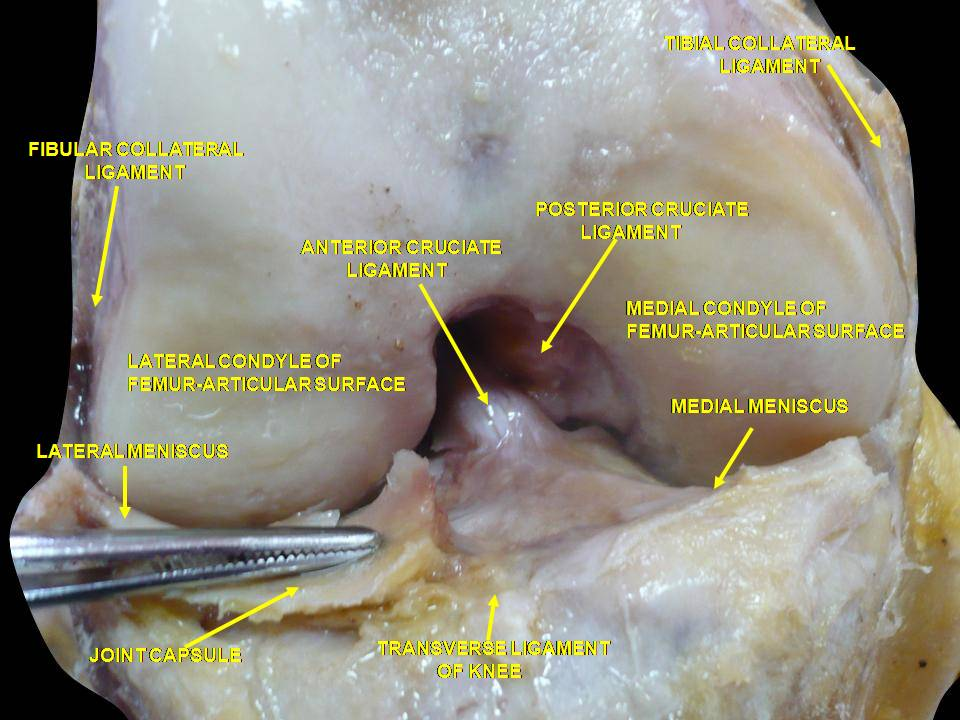
Anterior view of knee.

== Other animals ==
In humans, the term "knee" refers to the joints between the femur, tibia, and patella, in the leg.

In quadrupeds such as dogs, horses, and mice, the homologous joints between the femur, tibia, and patella, in the hind leg, are known as the stifle joint. Also in quadrupeds, particularly horses, ungulates, and elephants, the layman's term "knee" also commonly refers to the forward-facing joint in the foreleg, the carpus, which is homologous to the human wrist.

In birds, the "knee" is the joint between the femur and tibiotarsus, and also the patella (when present). The layman's term "knee" may also refer to the (lower and often more visible due to not being covered by feathers) joint between the tibiotarsus and tarsometatarsus, which is homologous to the human ankle.

In insects and other animals, the term knee widely refers to any hinge joint.

== See also ==
- Arthrofibrosis
- Articular cartilage repair
- Chondromalacia patellae
- Fibular collateral ligament
- Geniculum
- Genuflection
- Knee arthritis
- Knee cartilage replacement therapy
- Knee examination
- Kneecapping
- Kneeling
- Knésetja
- Medial collateral ligament
- Partial knee replacement unicompartmental knee arthroplasty
- Posterolateral corner injuries
- Reflex hammer
