= Knee effusion =

Accumulation of synovial fluid in or around the knee joint

- Other names: Swelling of the knee, water on the knee
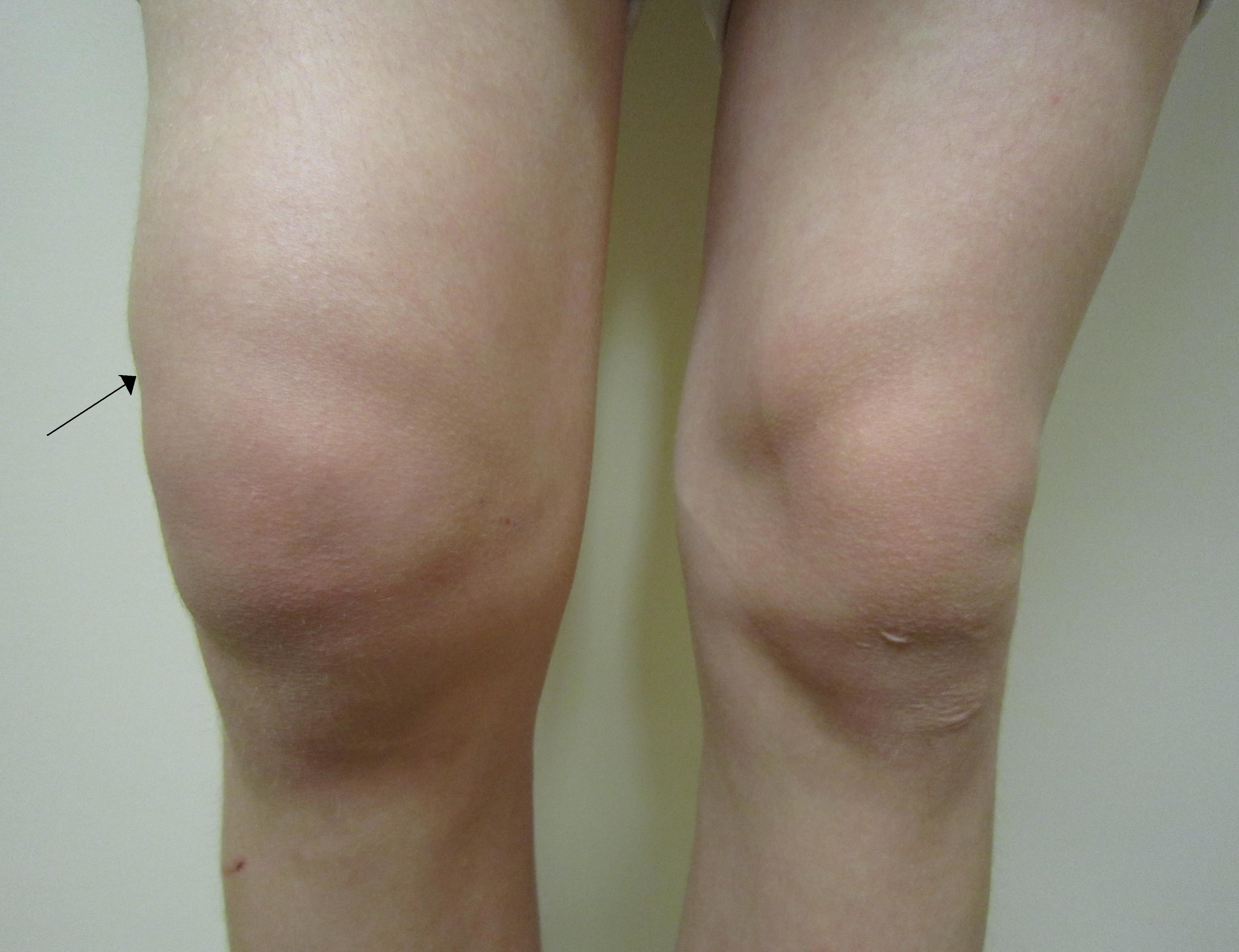
- Traumatic effusion of the right knee, with swelling lateral to the kneecap marked by an arrow
- Prevention: Maintaining a healthy weight Strengthening muscles Limit excessive use Low impact activities

Knee effusion, informally known as water on the knee, occurs when excess synovial fluid accumulates in or around the knee joint. It has many common causes, including arthritis, injury to the ligaments or meniscus, or fluid collecting in the bursa, a condition known as prepatellar bursitis.

== Signs and symptoms ==
Signs and symptoms of water on the knee depend on the cause of excess synovial fluid build-up in the knee joint. While important in lubrication, shock absorption, and nutrient transportation, too much can often be the culprit of a variety of symptoms. Some of which include:

=== Pain ===
Osteoarthritis knee pain usually occurs while the joint is bearing weight, so the pain typically subsides with rest; some patients experience severe pain, while others report no discomfort. Even if one knee is much larger than the other, pain is not guaranteed.

=== Swelling ===
One knee may appear larger than the other. Puffiness around the bony parts of the knee appear prominent when compared with the other knee.

=== Stiffness ===
When the knee joint contains excess fluid, it may become difficult or painful to bend or straighten. Fluid may also show under the knee when straightened.

=== Injury ===
If an individual has injured their knee, they may note bruising or deformity on the front, sides or rear of the knee. Bearing weight on the knee joint may be impossible, and the pain may be unbearable. Bruising may be observed first as red and later transitioning from bluish-purple to a green or yellow as it heals.

== Causes ==
Causes of the swelling can include arthritis, injury to the ligaments of the knee, or an accident after which the body's natural reaction is to surround the knee with a protective fluid. There could also be an underlying disease or condition. The type of fluid that accumulates around the knee depends on the underlying disease, condition or type of traumatic injury that caused the excess fluid. The swelling can, in most cases, be hard to maintain.

Underlying diseases may include

- Knee osteoarthritis
- Repetitive strain injury
- Rheumatoid arthritis
- Infection
- Gout
- Pseudogout
- Prepatellar bursitis (kneecap bursitis)
- Cysts
- Tumours

Having osteoarthritis or engaging in high-risk sports that involve rapid cut-and-run movements of the knee — football or tennis, for example — means an individual is more likely to develop water on the knee.

In overweight or obese individuals the body places more weight on the knee joint. This causes more wear in the joint. Over time, the body may produce excess joint fluid.

== Diagnosis/Imaging ==
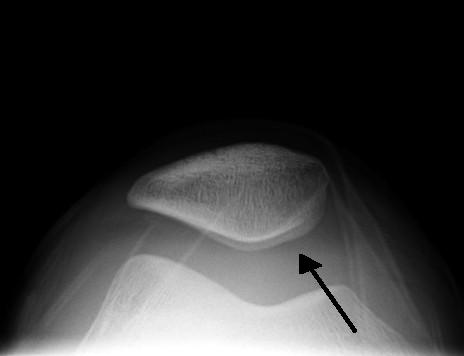
X-Ray skyline view of the patella demonstrating a large joint effusion as marked by the arrow

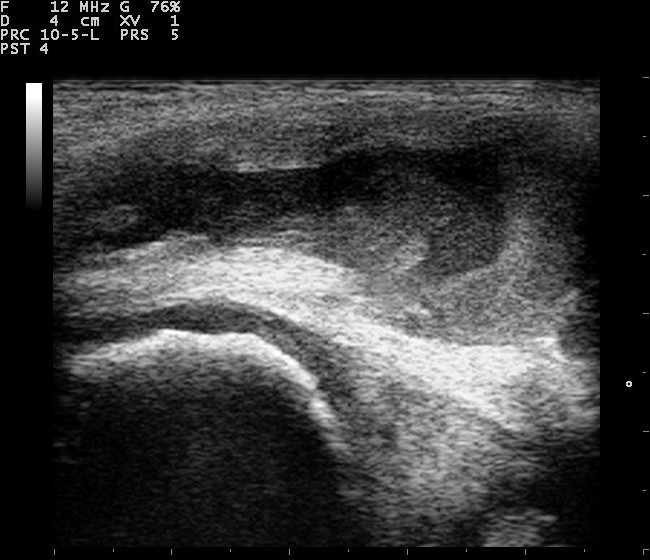
Ultrasound image of knee

=== Physical Exam ===
A doctor or other healthcare provider may begin initial assessment with a physical exam. Such clinical tests may include visual inspection, bulge/sweep sign, patellar tap/ballottement, balloon sign, or a combination. These clinical tests may be a good way to help guide clinical suspicion, but reliability may be influenced by provider and scenario.

=== X-Ray ===
An X-ray may be recommended by your provider as a way to obtain a 2-dimensional image to visualize the joint in question. In the presence of trauma an X-ray can be especially useful to verify that there is no break, dislocation, or deformity. In an atraumatic knee, an X-Ray can be used to identify or rule out other causes of a knee infusion including some inflammatory or age-related causes.

=== Ultrasound ===
Ultrasound imaging may be used by your doctor in their office as a diagnostic tool to better visualize the effusion and its size. This can also be an effective tool to guide treatment such as a joint aspiration.

=== MRI ===
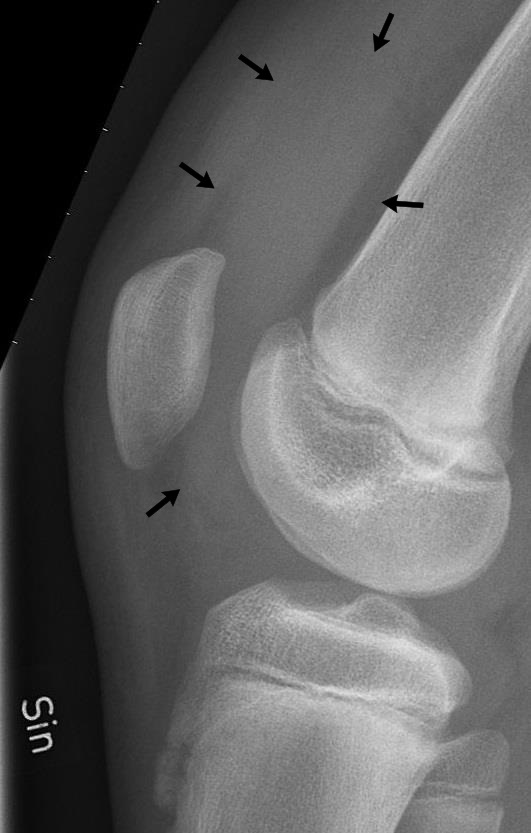
X-ray of the knee of a 12-year-old male, showing knee effusion of medium severity, marked by black arrows. It displaces the patella anteriorly and extends into the suprapatellar bursa.

Magnetic Resonance Imaging detects abnormalities of the bone or knee joint, such as damage to the ligaments, tendons or cartilage. Some injuries that include soft tissue damage that cannot be seen on X-Ray may require an MRI.

=== Blood tests ===
If one knee is swollen, red, and warm to the touch compared to the other knee, a doctor may be concerned about inflammatory arthritis (rheumatoid arthritis, gout, pseudogout, etc.), infection (Septic arthritis), or hemarthrosis (Blood within the joint space). Blood tests may be requested to determine a white blood cell count, erythrocyte sedimentation rate, and perhaps the level of C-reactive protein or uric acid. If blood tests reveal the presence of Lyme disease antibodies, this could potentially indicate a late manifestation of Lyme disease, known as Lyme arthritis.

=== Joint aspiration ===
Also known as arthrocentesis, this procedure includes withdrawal of fluid from inside the knee for analysis such as cell count, culture for bacteria, and examination for crystals, such as uric acid (Monosodium urate) or calcium pyrophosphate dihydrate crystals found in pseudogout.

== Treatment ==
=== Conservative Management ===
Treatment of fluid in the knee depends on the underlying cause of the swelling. General measures such as rest, ice, and analgesics such as acetaminophen (paracetamol) and NSAIDs are often recommended. Chymotrypsin, trypsin, and Diclofenac are also recommended. Heat may help relax the muscles of the knee in some.

=== Inflammatory Management ===
Some causes of effusion can be managed with medication if diagnosed with an inflammatory cause. Such instances would include rheumatoid arthritis, Lyme disease, gout, or pseudo gout.

=== Removal of Synovial Fluid ===
In addition to a diagnostic tool, arthrocentesis can be used to pull excess synovial fluid from the joint space. This pulled fluid can range widely in volume, and repeat arthrocentesis may need to be performed if the fluid reaccumulates. This procedure can be completed by feel of landmarks or via ultrasound guidance. Ultrasound guidance has been reported to show improved accuracy when compared to blind or by feel arthrocentesis.

=== Surgical Management ===
In some scenarios, permanent reduction or prevention of the excess fluid can be achieved. For those with damage to ligaments, tendons, or cartilage surgery may be an option for long-term treatment. As for infectious causes, treatment with antibiotics or sometimes an arthroscopic lavage may permanently resolve the issue. For those with hemarthrosis, an arthroscopic lavage may provide temporary or permanent management depending on the cause(Injury, Hemophilia, etc.).
