= Articular capsule of the knee joint =

Particular articular capsule

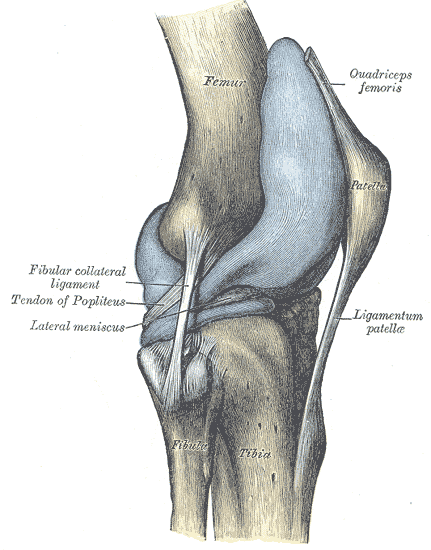
- Capsule of right knee-joint (distended). Lateral aspect.

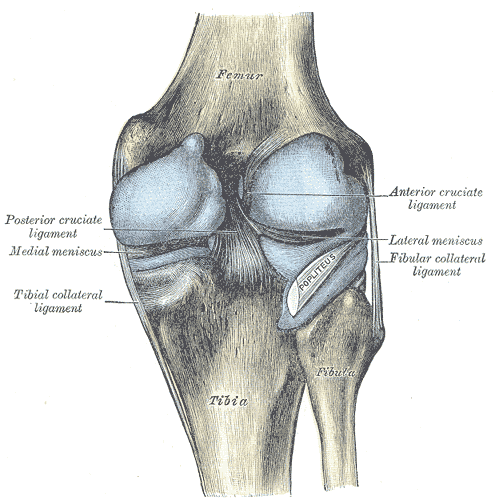
- Capsule of right knee-joint (distended). Posterior aspect.

Details

Identifiers
- Latin: capsula articularis articularis genus

The articular capsule of the knee joint is the wide and lax joint capsule of the knee. It is thin in front and at the side, and contains the patella, ligaments, menisci, and bursae of the knee. The capsule consists of an inner synovial membrane, and an outer fibrous membrane separated by fatty deposits anteriorly and posteriorly.

== Synovial membrane ==
Unfolding suprapatellar recess.

Anteriorly, the reflection of the synovial membrane lies on the femur; located at some distance from the cartilage because of the presence of the suprapatellar bursa. Above, the reflection appears lifted from the bone by underlying periosteal connective tissue. In a standing posture, the suprapatellar bursa is seemingly redundant. It is however also referred to as the suprapatellar synovial recess as it gradually unfolds as the knee is flexed; to open up completely when the knee is flexed 130 degrees. The suprapatellar bursa is prevented from being pinched during extension by the articularis genus muscle. On the tibia, the anterior reflection and attachment of the synovial membrane is located near the cartilage.

Anteriorly, the infrapatellar fat pad is inserted below the patella and between the two membranes. It extends from the lower margin of the patella above, to the infrapatellar synovial fold below. With its free upper margin, this fold extends dorsally through the joint space to surround the two cruciate ligaments from the front, thus dividing the surrounding joint space into two chambers. Laterally of this are a pair of alar folds.

Posteriorly, the femoral attachment of the synovial membrane is located at the cartilaginous margin of the lateral and medial femoral condyles, where the joint space has two dorsal extensions. Between these, the synovial membrane passes in front of the anterior and posterior cruciate ligaments, why these ligaments are both intracapsular and extra-articular with their tibial attachment located exactly on the cartilage margin. Both the lateral and medial meniscus are, however, located within the synovial capsule.

== Fibrous membrane ==
It is a thin, but strong, fibrous membrane which is strengthened in almost its entire extent by bands inseparably connected with it.

Above and in front, beneath the tendon of the quadriceps femoris, it is represented only by the synovial membrane.

Its chief strengthening bands are derived from the fascia lata and from the tendons surrounding the joint.

== Bursae ==
The numerous bursae surrounding the knee joint can be divided into the communicating and the non-communicating bursae:

- Communicating bursae:
  - The suprapatellar bursa, the largest bursa, extends the joint space anteriorly and proximally.
  - The subpopliteal recess and semimembranosus bursa are located posteriorly and are much smaller
  - The lateral and medial subtendinous bursae of gastrocnemius are located at the origin of the two heads of the gastrocnemius muscle.
- Non-communicating bursae:
  - The subcutaneous prepatellar bursa is located in front of the patella.
  - The [deep] infrapatellar bursa is located under the patella, between the patellar ligament and the fibrous membrane of the joint capsule. It is communicating with the joint space in particular cases.
  - Other less regularly present bursae include the subfascial prepatellar, the subtendinous prepatellar, and the subcutaneous prepatellar bursae.

Adding to the complex structure of the knee space, there are remnants of three embryonic septal divisions of the knee space called synovial plicae:

- The suprapatellar plica dividing the suprapatellar recess
- The infrapatellar plica, in front of the anterior cruciate ligament, reaches from the intercondylar notch to the infrapatellar fat pad
- The medial patellar plica, located adjacent to the patella's medial facet, runs vertically along the medial joint capsule

== Additional images ==
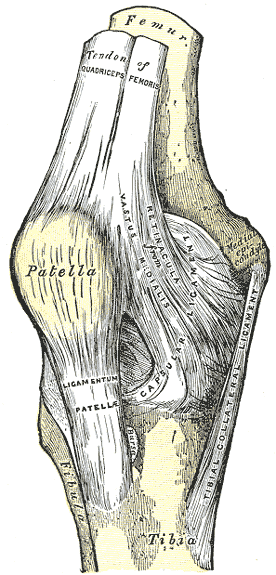

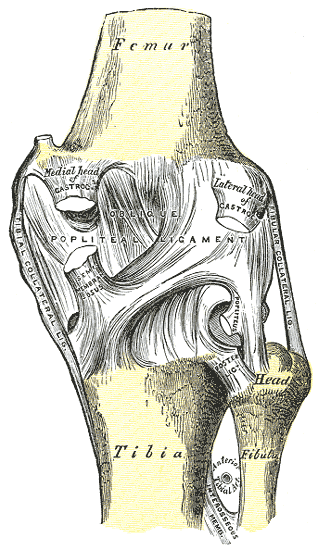

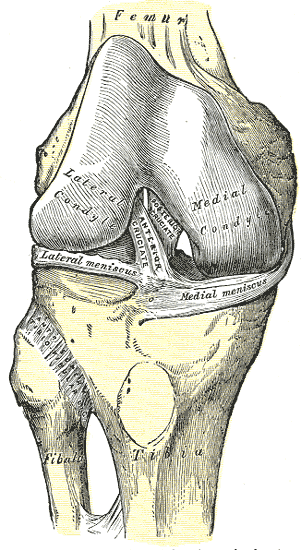

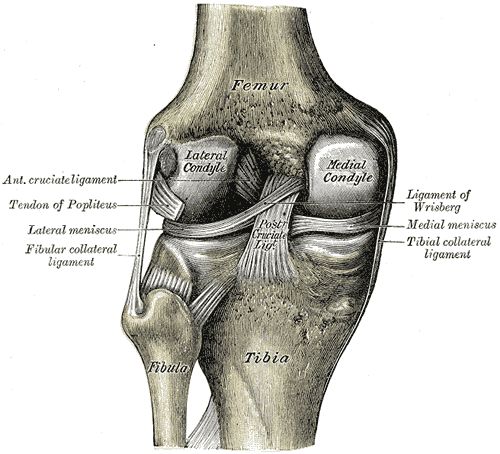

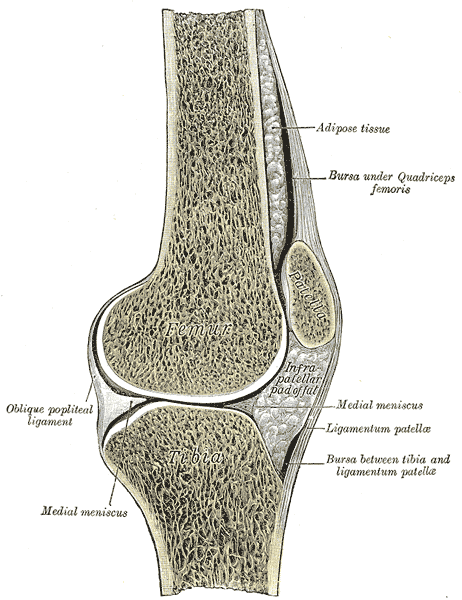
