= Prepatellar bursitis =

Inflammation of the prepatellar bursa at the front of the knee

- Other names: beat knee, carpet layer's knee, coal miner's knee, housemaid's knee, rug cutter's knee, nun's knee
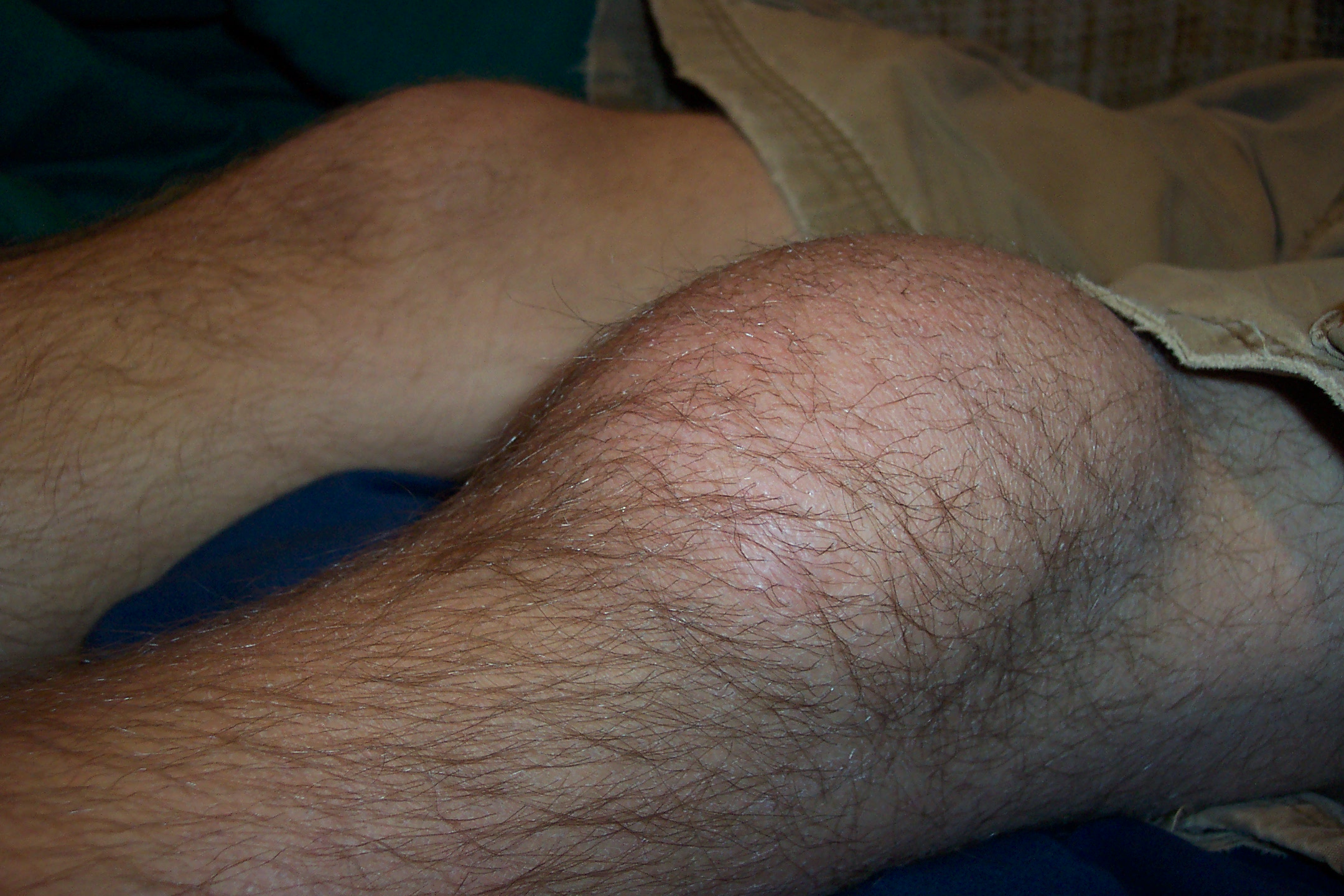
- Aseptic prepatellar bursitis
- Specialty: Orthopedic surgery, sports medicine, physical medicine and rehabilitation

Prepatellar bursitis is an inflammation of the prepatellar bursa at the front of the knee. It is marked by swelling at the knee, which can be tender to the touch and which generally does not restrict the knee's range of motion. It can be extremely painful and disabling as long as the underlying condition persists.

Prepatellar bursitis is most commonly caused by trauma to the knee, either by a single acute instance or by chronic trauma over time. Consequently the condition commonly occurs among people whose occupation requires frequent kneeling.

A definitive diagnosis can usually be made once a clinical history and physical examination have been obtained, though determining whether or not the inflammation is septic is not as straightforward. Treatment depends on the severity of the symptoms, with mild cases possibly only requiring rest and localized icing. Options for presentations with severe sepsis include intravenous antibiotics, surgical irrigation of the bursa, and bursectomy.

== Signs and symptoms ==
Lateral section of the knee

The primary symptom of prepatellar bursitis is swelling of the area around the kneecap. It generally does not produce a significant amount of pain unless pressure is applied directly. The area may be red (erythema), warm to the touch, or surrounded by cellulitis, particularly if infection is present, often accompanied by fever. Unlike arthritis, except in severe cases prepatellar bursitis generally does not affect the range of motion of the knee, though it may cause some discomfort in complete flexion of the joint. Flexion and extension of the knee may be accompanied by crepitus, the audible grating of bones, ligaments, or particles within the excess synovial fluid.

== Causes ==
In human anatomy, a bursa is a small pouch filled with synovial fluid. Its purpose is to reduce friction between adjacent structures. The prepatellar bursa is one of several bursae of the knee joint, and is located between the patella and the skin. Prepatellar bursitis is an inflammation of this bursa. Bursae are readily inflamed when irritated, as their walls are very thin. Along with the pes anserine bursa, the prepatellar bursa is one of the most common bursae to cause knee pain when inflamed.

Prepatellar bursitis is caused by either a single instance of acute trauma to the knee, or repeated minor trauma to the knee. The trauma can cause extravasation of nearby fluids into the bursa, which stimulates an inflammatory response. This response occurs in two phases: The vascular phase, in which the blood flow to the surrounding area increases, and the cellular phase, in which leukocytes migrate from the blood to the affected area. Other possible causes include gout, sarcoidosis, CREST syndrome, diabetes mellitus, alcohol use disorder, uremia, and chronic obstructive pulmonary disease. Some cases are idiopathic, though these may be caused by trauma that the patient does not remember.

The prepatellar bursa and the olecranon bursa are the two bursae that are most likely to become infected, or septic. Septic bursitis typically occurs when the trauma to the knee causes an abrasion, though it is also possible for the infection to be caused by bacteria traveling through the blood from a pre-existing infection site. In approximately 80% of septic cases, the infection is caused by Staphylococcus aureus; other common infections are Streptococcus, Mycobacterium, and Brucella. It is highly unusual for septic bursitis to be caused by anaerobes, fungi, or Gram-negative bacteria. In very rare cases, the infection can be caused by tuberculosis.

== Diagnosis ==
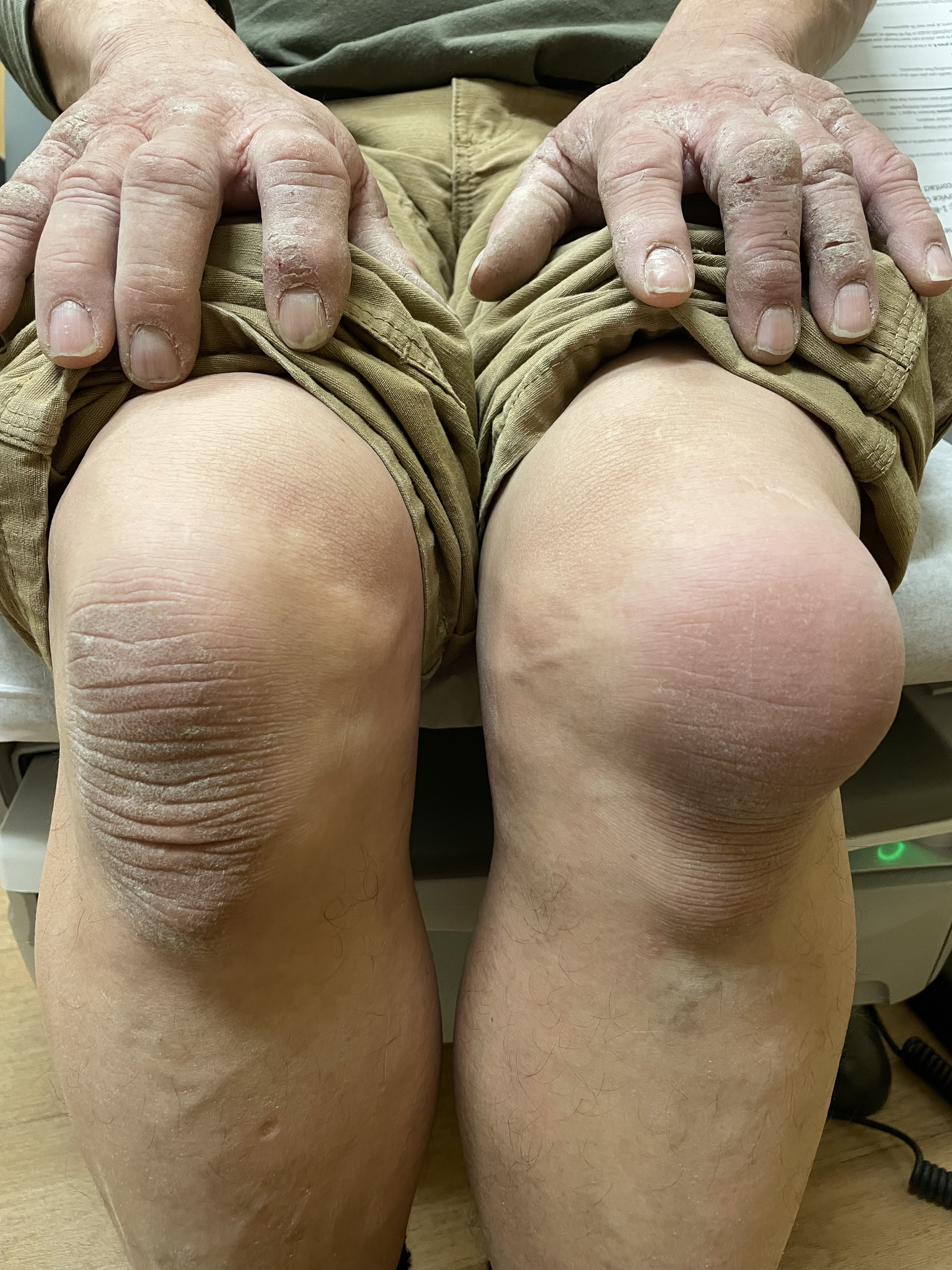
Left sided aseptic prepatellar bursitis in a retired concrete finisher.

There are several types of inflammation that can cause knee pain, including sprains, bursitis, and injuries to the meniscus. A diagnosis of prepatellar bursitis can be made based on a physical examination and the presence of risk factors in the person's medical history; swelling and tenderness at the front of the knee, combined with a profession that requires frequent kneeling, suggest prepatellar bursitis. Swelling of multiple joints along with restricted range of motion may indicate arthritis instead.

A physical examination and medical history are generally not enough to distinguish between infectious and non-infectious bursitis; aspiration of the bursal fluid is often required for this, along with a cell culture and Gram stain of the aspirated fluid. Septic prepatellar bursitis may be diagnosed if the fluid is found to have a neutrophil count above 1500 per microliter, a threshold significantly lower than that of septic arthritis (50,000 cells per microliter). A tuberculosis infection can be confirmed using a radiograph of the knee and urinalysis. It can be difficult to diagnose bursitis as symptoms often mimic those consistent with other injuries. Ultrasound and MRI are necessary for accurate identification.

== Prevention ==
It is possible to prevent the onset of prepatellar bursitis, or prevent the symptoms from worsening, by avoiding trauma to the knee or frequent kneeling. Protective knee pads can also help prevent prepatellar bursitis for those whose professions require frequent kneeling and for athletes who play contact sports, such as American football, basketball, and wrestling.

== Treatment ==
Non-septic prepatellar bursitis can be treated with rest, the application of ice to the affected area, and anti-inflammatory drugs, particularly ibuprofen. Elevation of the affected leg during rest may also expedite the recovery process. Severe cases may require fine-needle aspiration of the bursa fluid, sometimes coupled with cortisone injections. However, some studies have shown that steroid injections may not be an effective treatment option. After the bursitis has been treated, rehabilitative exercise may help improve joint mechanics and reduce chronic pain. Rehabilitation may include conditioning and stretching exercises.

Opinions vary as to which treatment options are most effective for septic prepatellar bursitis. McAfee and Smith recommend a course of oral antibiotics, usually oxacillin sodium or cephradine, and assert that surgery and drainage are unnecessary. Wilson-MacDonald argues that oral antibiotics are "inadequate", and recommends intravenous antibiotics for managing the infection. Some authors suggest surgical irrigation of the bursa by means of a subcutaneous tube. Others suggest that bursectomy may be necessary for intractable cases; the operation is an outpatient procedure that can be performed in less than half an hour.

== Epidemiology ==
The various nicknames associated with prepatellar bursitis arise from the fact that it commonly occurs among those individuals whose professions require frequent kneeling, such as carpenters, carpet layers, gardeners, housemaids, mechanics, miners, plumbers, and roofers. The exact incidence of the condition is not known; it is difficult to estimate because only severe septic cases require hospital admission, and mild non-septic cases generally go unreported. Prepatellar bursitis is more common among males than females. This is due to males being involved in higher occupational and recreational careers, giving more exposure to kneeling and trauma to the knee. It affects all age groups, but is more likely to be septic when it occurs in children. In teens the most common cause of bursitis is overuse. Repetitive motions in sports such as baseball, tennis, soccer or track cause the bursa to become inflamed.
