= Achilles bursitis =

- Other names: Achillobursitis
- Specialty: Physical medicine and rehabilitation

Achilles bursitis is bursitis (inflammation of synovial sac) of bursa situated above the insertion of tendon to calcaneus. It results from overuse and wearing of tight shoes.
