= Patellar tap =

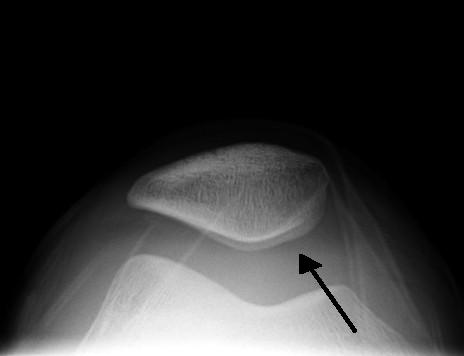
- Skyline view of the patella demonstrating a large joint effusion as marked by the arrow
- Purpose: Detecting a knee effusion

The patellar tap is a technique used in an examination of the knee to test for knee effusion or "water-on-the-knee".

With the examinee lying on their back, the examiner extends the knee and presses the area above the kneecap with the palm of one hand. This pushes fluid under the kneecap and lifts it. While keeping the pressure on with the first hand, the examiner uses the fingers of their other hand to press down on the kneecap. If a knee effusion is present, the kneecap will move down and "tap" the bone beneath.
