= Bursitis =

Inflammation of the bursae (sacs of synovial fluid in joints)

- Other names: student’s / plumber’s / miner’s elbow (olecranon bursitis), housemaid’s / carpenter’s / carpet layer’s knee (prepatellar bursitis), weaver’s / tailor’s bottom (ischial bursitis)
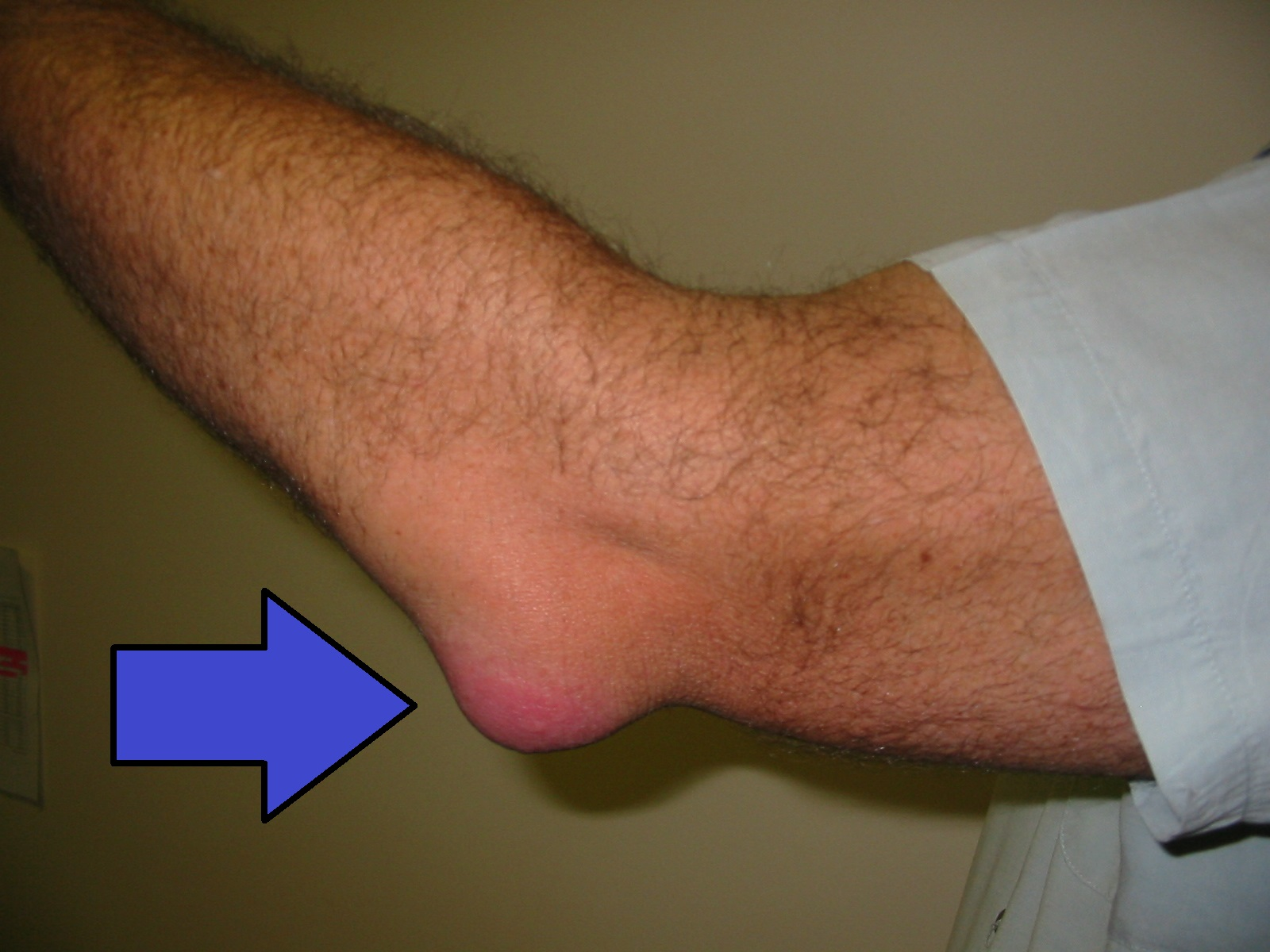
- Example of olecranon bursitis
- Specialty: Orthopedics
- Symptoms: localized swelling, erythema, pain, decreased range of motion
- Types: acute and chronic; non-infected (aseptic) and infected (septic); subacromial (shoulders), olecranon (elbows), prepatellar (knees), trochanteric (hips), ischial (butt)
- Causes: repetitive movements, excessive pressure, trauma, inflammatory conditions, autoimmune conditions, idiopathic
- Treatment: rest, ice, compression, elevation, anti-inflammatory and/or pain medication

Bursitis is the inflammation of one or more bursae in the body. Bursae are small sacs filled with lubricating synovial fluid that decrease friction at contact points between bones, skin, tendons, and muscle. Irritation of the bursae usually occurs as a result of overuse or trauma, but may also occur due to systemic illnesses. While there are more than 150 bursae in the human body, common sites of bursitis include the shoulder, elbow, hip, and knee. Bursitis is typically associated with redness and swelling, but may also be associated with pain, warmth, or decreased range of motion. Bursitis is typically treated with conservative management (e.g. rest, ice, compression, elevation, anti-inflammatory and/or pain medication), but additional evaluation and treatment (e.g. steroid injections or surgery) may be required if initial management fails.

== Signs and symptoms ==
Bursitis presents with redness and swelling over the affected region. It can be painful or painless. The presence of warmth may indicate an infectious bursitis (also known as septic bursitis). It can also be associated with pain with movement or decreased range of motion.

== Cause ==
The most common causes of bursitis are repetitive movements (e.g. throwing a ball, lifting an object) or positions (e.g. leaning on elbows, kneeling) that cause excessive pressure on the bursae. Direct trauma may also result in bursitis, with an increased risk of septic bursitis due to the introduction of bacteria if the overlying skin was damaged.

Less common causes include systemic inflammatory or autoimmune conditions such as arthritis (e.g. osteoarthritis, rheumatoid arthritis), gout, or lupus.

Bursitis may also be idiopathic, with the exact cause unknown.

== Mechanism ==
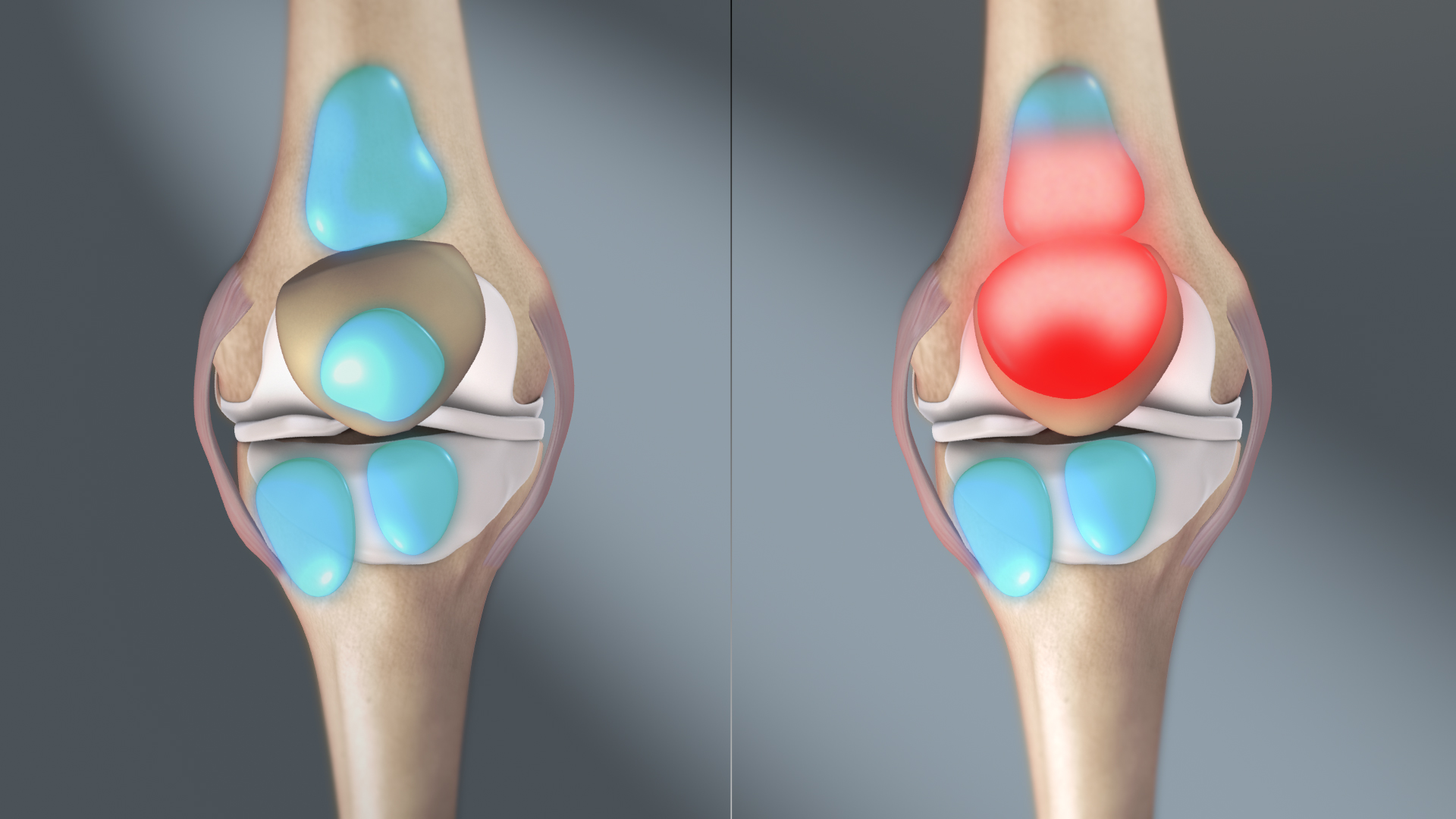
3D image showing normal bursa (left) and bursitis (right)

Bursitis is the inflammation of one or more bursae in the body. Bursae are sacs filled with a small amount of synovial fluid. Triggers such as overuse or trauma result in irritation that cause an increase in synovial fluid and enlargement of the bursae. Once enlarged, the inflamed bursae push on surrounding tissue (e.g bone, muscle, ligaments, skin) and cause symptoms (e.g. redness, swelling, pain, or decreased range of motion).

== Diagnosis ==
The primary evaluation of suspected bursitis should include a thorough history and physical exam as bursitis is a clinical diagnosis.

History taking helps identify the cause while also differentiating whether the bursitis is likely acute or chronic. While acute bursitis is typically painful, chronic bursitis can be painful or painless.

Physical examination involves (1) visualization of the area for signs of erythema, swelling, or physical trauma, (2) palpation over the bursa to assess for warmth or tenderness, and (3) movement of the associated extremity to evaluate for pain or decreased range of motion.

If septic or crystalline bursitis is suspected, removal of fluid via aspiration may be required to evaluate for signs of infection or crystals.

While imaging it is not required to diagnosis bursitis, it may still have utility for identifying the underlying cause (e.g. radiograph to reveal bony abnormalities) or support a suspected diagnosis (e.g. ultrasound or MRI to show fluid collections or soft tissue swelling).

== Treatment ==
Initial treatment of bursitis typically involves conservative management including rest, ice, compression, anti-inflammatory medications, and pain medications. Physical therapy may also help address associated issues (e.g. tendinopathies) to prevent recurrence.

If conservative management fails, additional interventions, such as steroid injections or fluid removal via needle aspiration, may provide temporary relief. Rarely, removal of the bursa via bursectomy may be required.

In cases of suspected septic bursitis, treatment may require antibiotic therapy and fluid removal via incision and drainage.

Treatment of the less common causes of bursitis (e.g. systemic inflammatory or autoimmune conditions) should involve treatment of the underlying cause.

== Prevention ==
Prevention of bursitis primarily involves avoidance of triggers (e.g. excessive pressure or repetitive movements) and activity modification (e.g. using elbow or knee pads, proper lift techniques, frequent breaks).

If an underlying cause (e.g. systemic inflammatory or autoimmune condition such as arthritis, gout, or lupus) is identified, it should be treated.

== See also ==
- Subacromial bursitis
- Olecranon bursitis
- Prepatellar bursitis
- Ischial bursitis
- Achilles bursitis
