= Articularis genus muscle =

Small skeletal muscle

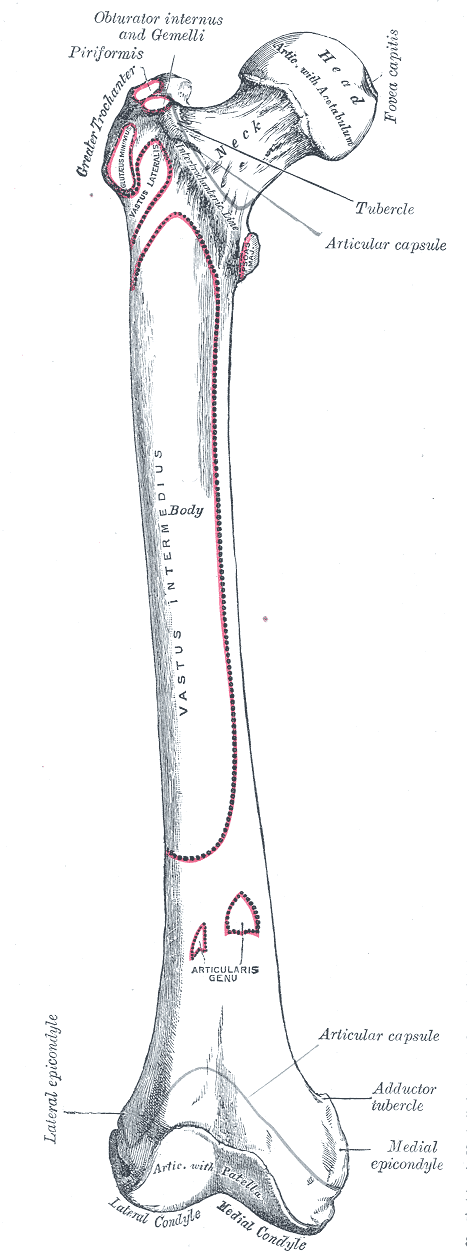
- Anterior surface of right femur. Origin of articularis genus labelled at bottom middle of image.

Details
- Origin: Femur
- Insertion: Suprapatellar bursa
- Artery: Femoral artery
- Nerve: Femoral nerve
- Actions: Pulling the suprapatellar bursa during extension of the knee

Identifiers
- Latin: musculus articularis genus
- TA98: A04.7.02.024
- TA2: 2625
- FMA: 22437

The articularis genus (also known as the subcrureus muscle) is a small skeletal muscle located anteriorly on the thigh just above the knee.

== Structure ==
It arises from the anterior surface of the lower part of the body of the femur, deep to the vastus intermedius, close to the knee and from the deep fibers of the vastus intermedius.

Its insertion is on the synovial membrane of the knee-joint.

=== Blood supply ===
It is supplied by the lateral femoral circumflex artery.

=== Innervation ===
It is innervated by branches of the femoral nerve (L2-L4).

=== Variation ===
Flat, wispy and highly variable, sometimes consisting of several separate muscular bundles, this muscle is without a distinct investing fascia and ranges 1.5–3 cm in width.

It is usually distinct from the vastus intermedius, but occasionally blended with it.

== Function ==
Articularis genus pulls the suprapatellar bursa superiorly during extension of the knee, and prevents impingement of the synovial membrane between the patella and the femur.
