= Synovial sac =

Joint component

The synovial sac is one of the seven parts of a joint located in the body, along with muscle, tendon, ligament, bone, articular cartilage and bursa. The synovial sac is a thin tissue that lines the joint. It is filled with a fluid that works like oil in a car, lubricating the joint and making it move easily. If this sac is ruptured or destroyed from continuous use or being overweight over a long period of time, it may cause the bones to become stiff and can cause arthritis.
