= Vestibular sacs =

Vestibular sac may refer to:

- Saccule, a bed of sensory cells situated in the inner ear
- Utricle (ear), the other of the two otolith organs located in the vertebrate inner ear
