= Bursectomy =

Surgical removal of bursae (sacs of synovial fluid in joints)

- ICD-9-CM: 83.5

A bursectomy is the removal of a bursa, which is a small sac filled with synovial fluid that cushions adjacent bone structures and reduces friction in joint movement. This procedure is usually carried out to relieve chronic inflammation (bursitis) or infection, when conservative management has failed to improve patient outcomes.

== See also ==
- List of surgeries by type
