= Olecranon bursitis =

Medical condition; swelling, redness, and pain at the tip of the elbow

- Other names: Elbow bursitis, liquid elbow, elbow bump, student's elbow, Popeye elbow, baker's elbow, swellbow
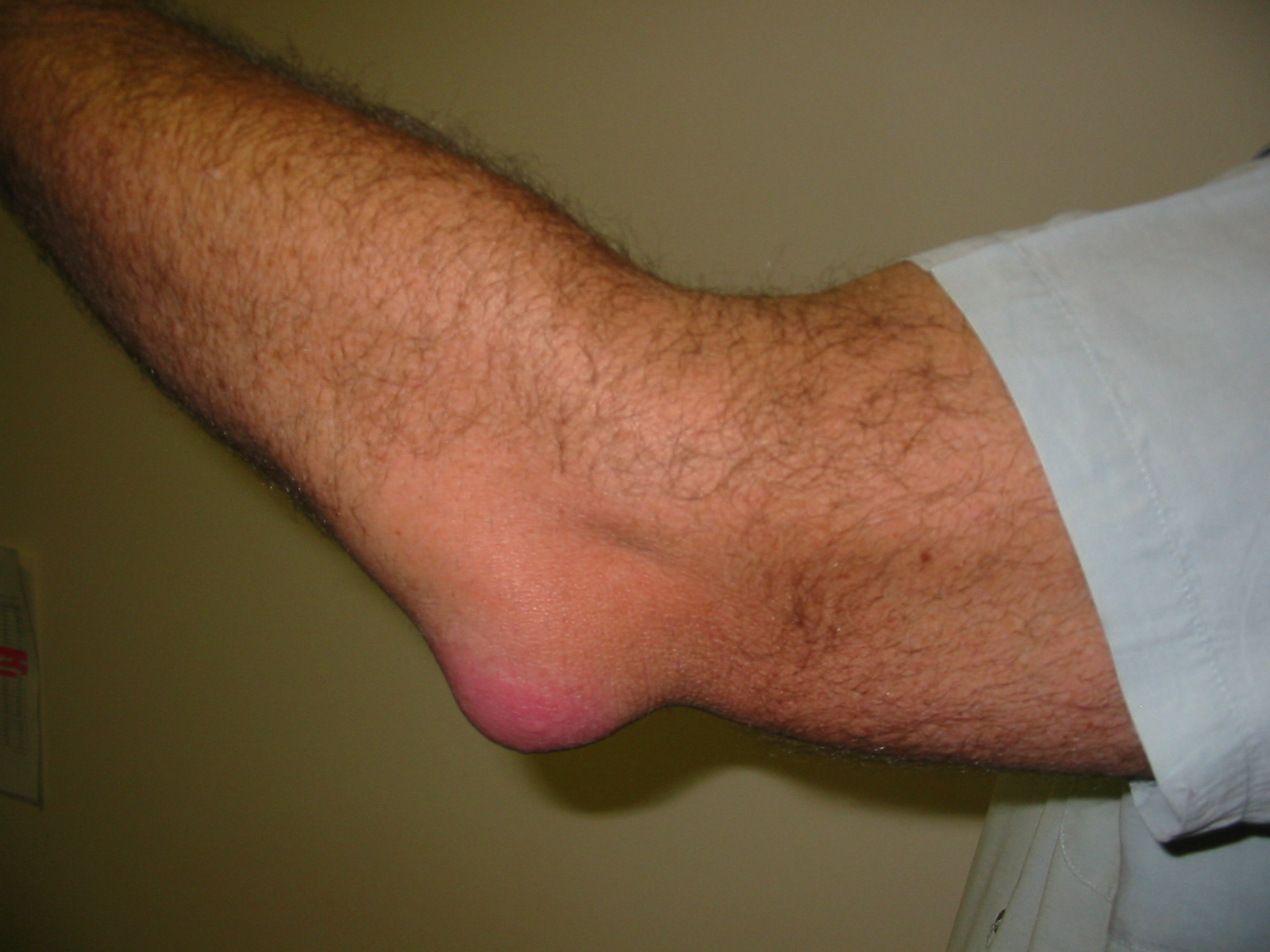
- Olecranon bursitis
- Specialty: Emergency medicine, orthopedics
- Symptoms: Swelling, redness, and pain at the tip of the elbow
- Types: Acute, chronic, septic
- Causes: Trauma, pressure, infection
- Risk factors: Rheumatoid arthritis, gout
- Diagnostic method: Based on symptoms
- Differential diagnosis: Septic arthritis, tendinitis, cellulitis
- Prevention: Elbow pads
- Treatment: Avoiding further trauma, compression bandage, NSAIDs, drainage, surgery
- Frequency: Relatively common.

Olecranon bursitis is a condition characterized by swelling, redness, and pain at the tip of the elbow. If the underlying cause is due to an infection, fever may be present. The condition is relatively common and is one of the most frequent types of bursitis.

It usually occurs as a result of trauma or pressure to the elbow, infection, or certain medical conditions such as rheumatoid arthritis or gout. Olecranon bursitis is associated with certain types of work including plumbing, mining, gardening, and mechanics. The underlying mechanism is inflammation of the fluid filled sac between the olecranon and skin. Diagnosis is usually based on symptoms.

Treatment involves avoiding further trauma, a compression bandage, and NSAIDs. If there is concern of infection the fluid should be drained and tested and antibiotics are typically recommended. The use of steroid injections is controversial. Surgery may be done if other measures are not effective.

== Signs and symptoms ==
Symptoms include swelling in the elbow, which can sometimes be large enough to restrict motion. There is pain originating in the elbow joint from mild to severe which can spread to the rest of the arm. If the bursa is infected, there also will be prominent redness and the skin will feel very warm. Another symptom would include the infected bursa possibly opening spontaneously and draining pus.

== Causes ==
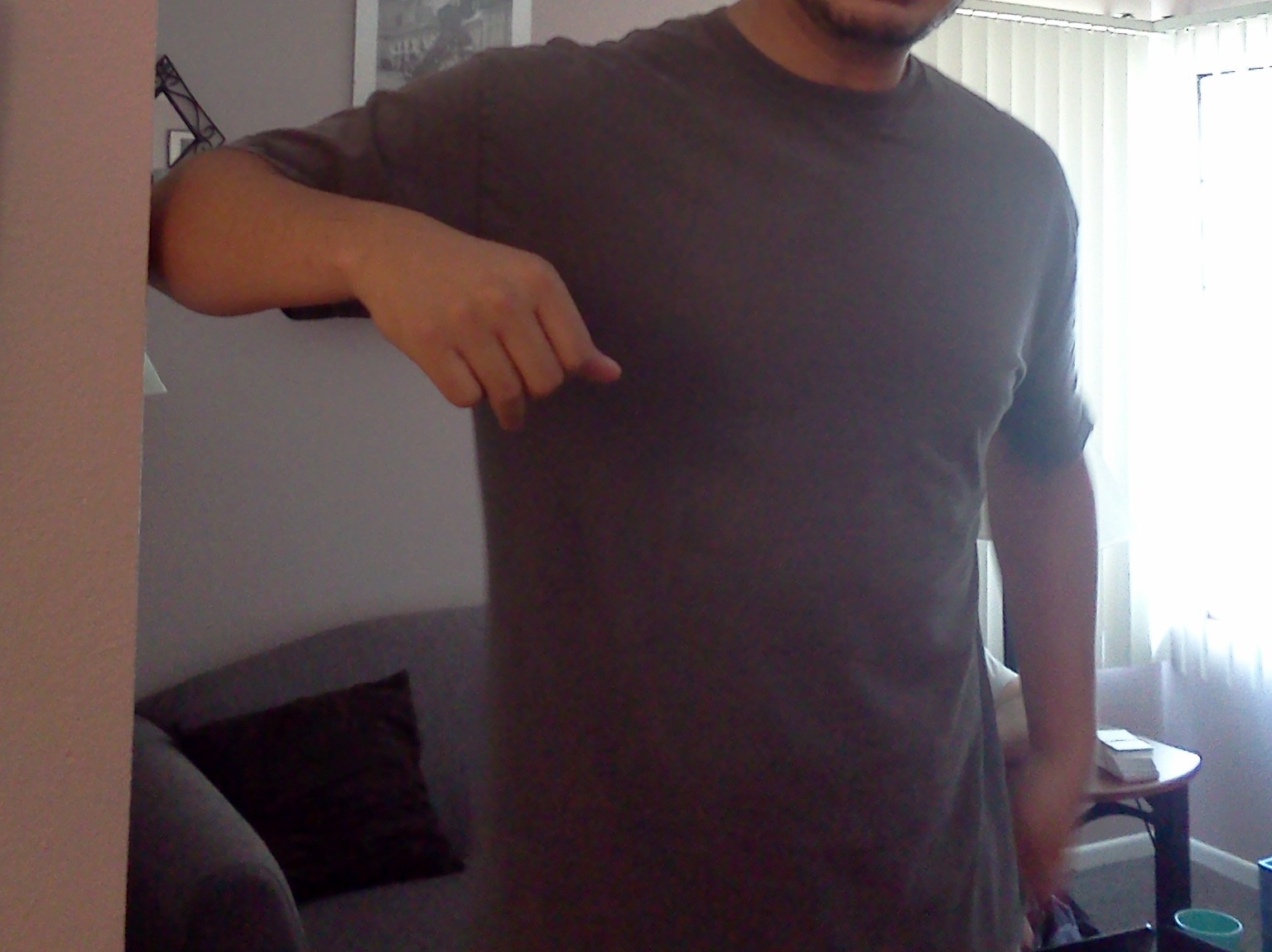
Hard blow to the tip of the elbow on a wall

Bursitis normally develops as a result either of a single injury to the elbow (for example, a hard blow to the tip of the elbow), or perhaps more commonly due to repeated minor injuries, such as repeated leaning on the point of the elbow on a hard surface. The chance of developing bursitis is higher if one's job or hobby involves a repetitive movement (for example, tennis, golf, or even repetitive computer work involving leaning on one's elbow). The likelihood of developing the condition is increased as one gets older.

As a reaction to injury, the lining of the bursa becomes inflamed. It then secretes a much greater than normal amount of fluid into the closed cavity of the bursa, from where it has nowhere to go. The bursa therefore inflates, producing a swelling over the proximal end of the ulna which is usually inflamed and tender.

Another possible cause of inflammation of the bursa is infection, which can usually (but not always) be traced to a crack or other lesion in the skin which allowed for bacteria of the normal skin flora to invade deeper layers of tissue.

This bursa is located just over the extensor aspect of the extreme proximal end of the ulna. In common with other bursae, it is impalpable and contains only a very small amount of fluid in its normal state, and fulfills the function of facilitating the joint's movement by enabling anatomical structures to glide more easily over each other.

== Diagnosis ==
Diagnosis is usually based on symptoms. If there is concern of infection, it is standard for the fluid to be drained and tested.

== Treatments ==
=== Non-surgical ===
Conservative management of minor cases involves icing, a compression bandage, and avoidance of the aggravating activity. This can also be augmented with NSAIDs taken by mouth or applied as a cream. Elbow padding can also be used for symptomatic relief. The use of steroid injections is controversial.

In case of infection, the bursitis should be drained and treated with an antibiotic.

=== Surgery ===
If the fluid continues to return after multiple drainings or the bursa is constantly causing pain, surgery to remove the bursa is an option. The minor operation removes the bursa from the elbow and is left to regrow but at a normal size over a period of ten to fourteen days. It is usually done under general anesthetic and has minimal risks. The surgery does not disturb any muscle, ligament, or joint structures. To recover from surgical removal, a splint will be applied to the arm to protect the skin. Exercises will be prescribed to improve range of motion.
