= Knee bursae =

Fluid-filled sacs of the knee joint

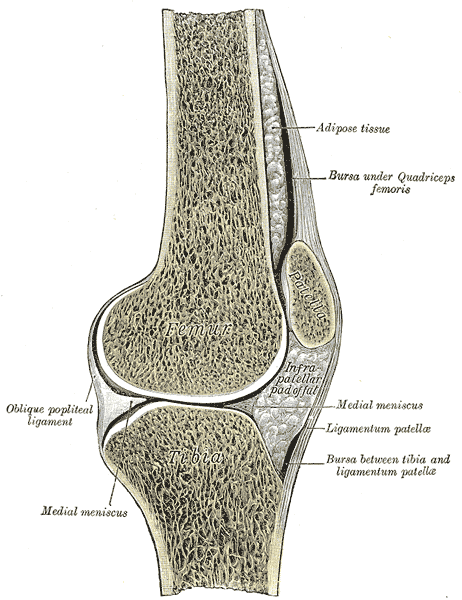
- Sagittal section of right knee-joint, thus showing only frontal bursae.

The knee bursae are the fluid-filled sacs and synovial pockets that surround and sometimes communicate with the knee joint cavity. The bursae are thin-walled, and filled with synovial fluid. They represent the weak point of the joint, but also provide enlargements to the joint space. They can be grouped into either communicating and non-communicating bursae or, after their location – frontal, lateral, or medial.

== Frontal ==
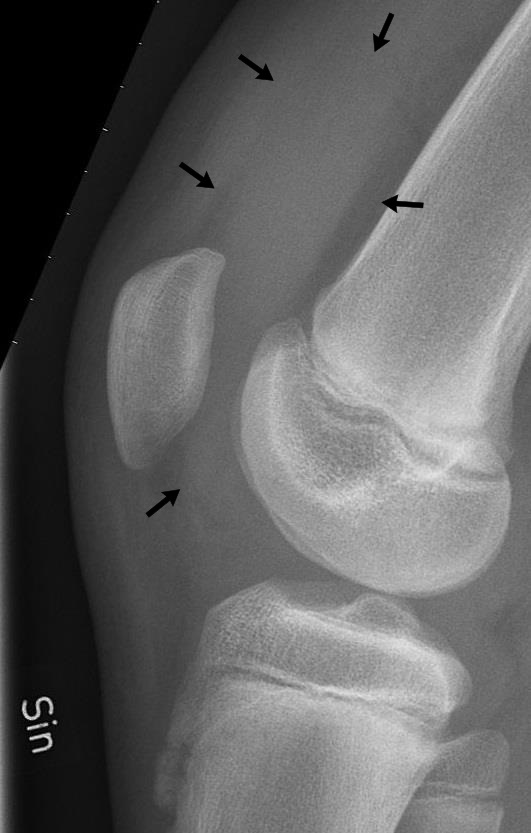
X-ray of the knee of a 12-year-old male, with knee effusion extending into the suprapatellar bursa.

In front, there are five bursae:

1. the suprapatellar bursa or recess between the anterior surface of the lower part of the femur and the deep surface of the quadriceps femoris. It allows for movement of the quadriceps tendon over the distal end of the femur. In about 85% of individuals, this bursa communicates with the knee joint. A distension of this bursa is therefore generally an indication of knee effusion.
2. the prepatellar bursa between the patella and the skin It allows movement of the skin over the underlying patella.
3. the deep infrapatellar bursa between the upper part of the tibia and the patellar ligament. It allows for movement of the patellar ligament over the tibia.
4. the subcutaneous (or superficial) infrapatellar bursa between the patellar ligament and skin.
5. the pretibial bursa between the tibial tuberosity and the skin. It allows for movement of the skin over the tibial tuberosity.

== Lateral ==
Laterally there are four bursae:

1. the lateral gastrocnemius (subtendinous) bursa between the lateral head of the gastrocnemius and the joint capsule
2. the fibular bursa between the lateral (fibular) collateral ligament and the tendon of the biceps femoris
3. the fibulopopliteal bursa between the fibular collateral ligament and the tendon of the popliteus
4. and the subpopliteal recess (or bursa) between the tendon of the popliteus and the lateral condyle of the femur

== Medial ==
Medially, there are five bursae:

1. the medial gastrocnemius (subtendinous) bursa between the medial head of the gastrocnemius and the joint capsule
2. the anserine bursa between the medial (tibial) collateral ligament and the pes anserinus – the conjoined tendons of the sartorius, gracilis, and semitendinosus muscles.
3. the bursa semimembranosa between the medial collateral ligament and the tendon of the semimembranosus
4. there is one between the tendon of the semimembranosus and the head of the tibia
5. and occasionally there is a bursa between the tendons of the semimembranosus and semitendinosus

== See also ==
- Lateral meniscus
- Medial meniscus
