= Prepatellar bursa =

Fluid-filled sac of the knee joint

- Sagittal section of right knee-joint, thus showing only frontal bursae. Area of prepatellar bursa marked

Details

Identifiers
- Latin: bursa praepatellaris
- TA98: A04.8.05.014
- TA2: 2735
- FMA: 45198

The prepatellar bursa is a frontal bursa of the knee joint. It is a superficial bursa with a thin synovial lining located between the skin and the patella.

== Pathology ==
Prepatellar bursitis, also known as housemaid's knee, is a common cause of swelling and pain above the patella (kneecap), and is due to inflammation of the prepatellar bursa. It is common in people who frequently kneel, such as roofers, plumbers, carpet layers, and gardeners. It is also common in wrestlers due to the repeated impact on the knee when shooting.

== Symptoms ==
Symptoms include knee pain, swelling, redness and inability to flex the knee on the affected side. Rest usually relieves symptoms. Physical exam reveals erythema, tenderness to touch, fluctuant edema over the lower pole of the patella and crepitus.

== Treatment ==
General treatments consist of bursal aspiration, NSAIDs. For patients with high athletic or occupational demands, intrabursal steroid injection may be performed. Surgical treatment is restricted to severe cases.
