= Coronary ligament of the knee =

Ligament of the knee

Coronary ligament of knee (absent from illustration below)
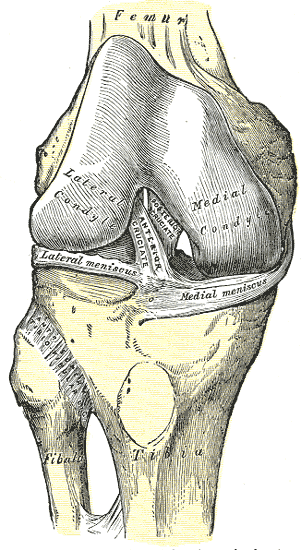
- Right knee-joint, flexed, from the front. Coronary ligaments absent from illustration, but would be just inferior to menisci, joining to tibial plateau.

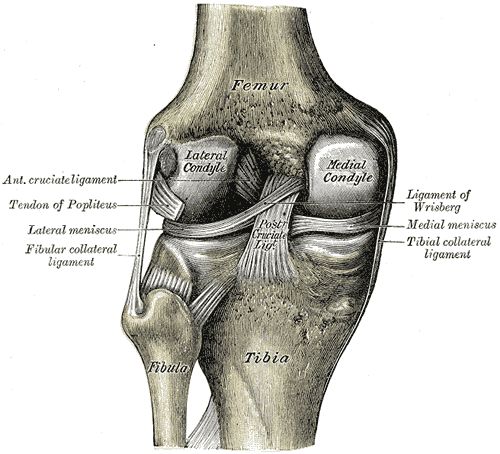
- Left knee-joint, extended, from behind. Again, coronary ligaments absent from illustration, but would be just inferior to menisci, joining to tibial plateau.

Identifiers
- TA98: A10.1.02.302
- TA2: 3772

The coronary ligaments of the knee (also known as meniscotibial ligaments) are portions of the joint capsule which connect the inferior edges of the fibrocartilaginous menisci to the periphery of the tibial plateaus.

== Structure ==
The coronary ligaments of the knee are continuous with the joint capsule and the menisci.

== Function ==
The coronary ligaments function to connect parts of the outside, inferior edges of the medial and lateral menisci to the joint capsule of the knee.

The medial meniscus also has firm attachments laterally to the intercondylar area of the tibia and medially to the tibial collateral ligament.

The lateral meniscus has firm attachments medially to the intercondylar area via the ends of the meniscus, and posteromedially via the posterior meniscofemoral ligament, which attaches the posterior limb of the meniscus to the posterior cruciate ligament and medial femoral condyle. The lateral meniscus is not directly connected to the fibular collateral ligament, and is thus more movable than the medial meniscus.

== Additional images ==
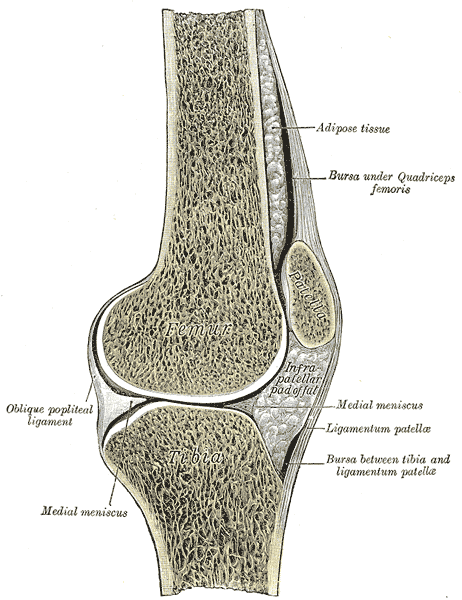
Sagittal section of right knee. Coronary ligament not labeled, but visible as connective tissue joining the wedge-shaped meniscus inferiorly to the perimeter of the tibial plateau.

== References/External links ==
- Gray, Henry. Anatomy of the Human Body. Philadelphia: Lea & Febiger, 1918; Bartleby.com, 2000. 7b. The Knee.
- Moore, Keith L. and Arthur F. Dalley. Clinically Oriented Anatomy, 5th ed. (2006) p688-693. ISBN 0-7817-3639-0
- Lateral Meniscus - Wheeless' Textbook of Orthopaedics
- Medial Meniscus - Wheeless' Textbook of Orthopaedics
