= Meniscofemoral ligament =

Meniscofemoral ligament can refer to:

- Anterior meniscofemoral ligament
- Posterior meniscofemoral ligament
