= Knee cartilage replacement therapy =

- Specialty: Orthopedic surgery

Articular cartilage, most notably that which is found in the knee joint, is generally characterized by very low friction, high wear resistance, and poor regenerative qualities. It is responsible for much of the compressive resistance and load bearing qualities of the knee joint and, without it, walking is painful to impossible. Osteoarthritis is a common condition of cartilage failure that can lead to limited range of motion, bone damage and invariably, pain. Due to a combination of acute stress and chronic fatigue, osteoarthritis directly manifests itself in a wearing away of the articular surface and, in extreme cases, bone can be exposed in the joint. Some additional examples of cartilage failure mechanisms include cellular matrix linkage rupture, chondrocyte protein synthesis inhibition, and chondrocyte apoptosis. There are several different repair options available for cartilage damage or failure.

"Maci" or autologous cultured chondrocytes on porcine collagen membrane, is a treatment to correct cartilage defects in the knee. This treatment has been approved by the Food and Drug Administration in 2016 for adult treatment only.

== Autologous matrix-induced chondrogenesis ==
Autologous matrix-induced chondrogenesis, which is also known as AMIC, is a biological treatment option for articular cartilage damage bone marrow stimulating technique in combination with a collagen membrane. It is based on the microfracture surgery with the application of a bi-layer collagen I/III membrane.

The AMIC technique was developed to improve some of the shortfalls of microfracture surgery such as variable repair cartilage volume and functional deterioration over time. The collagen membrane protects and stabilizes the MSCs released through microfracture and enhances their chondrogenic differentiation.

The AMIC surgery is a single-step procedure. Once cartilage damage is assessed there are two methods to access the joint to proceed with the AMIC surgery. First is to perform a mini arthrotomy. Second is an all-arthroscopic procedure.

== Autologous chondrocyte implantation ==
The human body's own cartilage is still the best material for lining knee joints. This drives efforts to develop ways of using a person's own cells to grow, or re-grow cartilage tissue to replace missing or damaged cartilage. One cell-based replacement technique is called autologous chondrocyte implantation (ACI) or autologous chondrocyte transplantation (ACT).

A review evaluating autologous chondrocyte implantation was published in 2010. The conclusions are that it is an effective treatment for full thickness chondral defects. The evidence does not suggest ACI is superior to other treatments.

One ACI treatment, called MACI (autologous cultured chondrocytes on a porcine collagen matrix), is indicated for healthy patients 18–55 with medium to large sized damage to their cartilage. It is not applicable to osteoarthritis patients. The patient's chondrocytes are removed arthroscopically from a non load-bearing area from either the intercondylar notch or the superior ridge of the medial or lateral femoral condyles. 10,000 cells are harvested and grown in vitro for approximately six weeks until the population reaches 10-12 million cells. Then these cells are seeded onto a film that is implanted into the area of cartilage damage and absorbed back into the tissue into the patient. The implanted chondrocytes then divide and integrate with surrounding tissue and potentially generate hyaline-like cartilage.

Another ACI technique, using "chondospheres", uses only chondrocytes and no matrix material. The cells grow in self-organized spheroid matrices which are implanted via injected fluid or inserted tissue matrix.

Techniques such as the EELS-TALC to enhance ACI and MACI with enabling chondrocytes to be tissue engineered with long term native knee cartilage phenotype maintenance in vitro and in vivo, with the engineered tissue construct containing stem cell progenitors along with those expressing pluripotency markers and with added advantage of enriched hyaluronic acid (HA) expression by the cells have been reported which will contribute to improvised regenerative therapies for cartilage damage.

== Autologous mesenchymal stem cell transplantation ==
Because mesenchymal stem cells may regenerate cartilage, cartilage growth in human knees using autologous cultured mesenchymal stem cells is under research and preliminary clinical use, and appears to be safe as of 2016. An advantage to this approach is that a person's own stem cells are used, avoiding tissue rejection by the immune system. Stem cells enable surgeons to grow replacement cartilage, which gives the new tissue greater growth potential. While there are few long-term studies as of 2018, a history of knee problems and body weight are factors for how well the procedure will work.

== Microdrilling augmented with peripheral blood stem cells ==
A 2011 study reported histologically confirmed hyaline cartilage regrowth in the knee. The successful protocol involved arthroscopic microdrilling/ microfracture surgery followed by postoperative injections of autologous peripheral blood progenitor cells (PBPCs) and hyaluronic acid. The procedure creates a blood clot scaffold on which injected PBPCs can be recruited and enhance chondrogenesis at the site of the contained lesion.

== See also ==
- Meniscal cartilage replacement therapy
- Meniscus transplant
- Spheroids of human autologous matrix-associated chondrocytes
