= Meniscal cartilage replacement therapy =

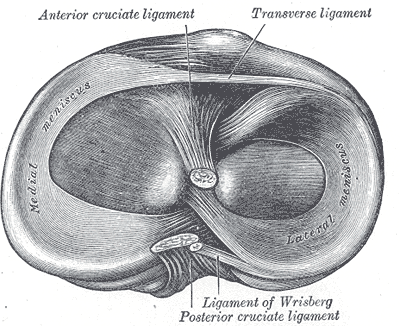
- Head of right tibia seen from above, showing menisci and attachments of ligaments
- Specialty: Orthopedic

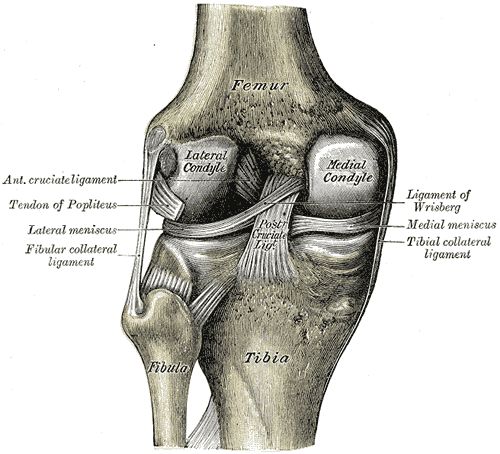
Left knee-joint from behind, showing interior ligaments

Meniscal cartilage replacement therapy is surgical replacement of the meniscus of the knee as a treatment for where the meniscus is so damaged that it would otherwise need to be removed.

== Anatomy ==
The meniscus is a C-shaped piece of fibrocartilage located at the peripheral aspect of the knee joint that offers lubrication and nutrition to the joint. Each knee has two menisci, medial and lateral, whose purpose is to provide space between the tibia and the femur, preventing friction and allowing for the diffusion of articular cartilage.

The majority of the meniscus has no blood supply. As a result, if the meniscus is damaged, from trauma or with age, it is unable to undergo the body’s normal healing process. Therefore, a torn piece can begin to move inside the joint, get caught between the bones, and cause pain, swelling, and decreased mobility. However, recent research has called into question whether many meniscus tears actually cause pain or are simply part of the normal degenerative process of aging. A 2008 study in the New England Journal of Medicine which shows that about 60% of meniscus tears cause no pain and are found in asymptomatic subjects. The three major treatments for a damaged meniscus are repair, removal, and transplantation. The surgery is often carried out arthroscopically.

== Repair ==
During repair, the tissues are securely held together long enough for biological healing to occur. One procedure involves threading long needles into the meniscus and out an incision in the back of the knee through the aid of a guide tube called a cannula. The suture thread ends are tied together on the outside of the knee capsule layer to bring the tear together. Another procedure requires specially designed devices that employ multiple sutures and knot pusher instruments to allow surgeons to provide excellent meniscal repair with just a single 1 ½” incision.

The majority of meniscal tears are not suitable for repair and instead the torn piece is removed, known as a meniscectomy. The torn portion of the meniscus is cut and sucked out of the joint, leaving behind as much normal meniscal cartilage as possible. The remaining meniscal rim is then rebalanced and contoured to provide a mechanically optimal shape.

== Replacement ==
In some cases, the meniscal tear is so extensive that the entire meniscus must be removed, leaving the joint prone to constant pain and swelling. Removal of the meniscus cartilage leads to progressive, degenerative arthritis of the knee joint. Replacing the badly damaged or deficient meniscus with a meniscus transplant from a human donor restores normal knee structure and helps protect the remaining joint surfaces. Meniscal transplantation is relatively uncommon, although it is gaining popularity. Meniscal transplantation was previously indicated for patients with mild arthritis who are younger than 50 years of age. The population for whom meniscal transplantation is appropriate has expanded. Survival data from a recent, long-term follow-up study shows that meniscal transplantation is also successful in older, arthritic patients with a success rate of 89.4% (42 of 47 transplants) at an average of 4.4 years. Meniscal transplantation offers patients with badly damaged cartilage an alternative to total joint replacement, and allows patients to pursue active lifestyles including impact sports.

== See also ==
- Knee cartilage replacement therapy
- Cartilage
