= Spheroids of human autologous matrix-associated chondrocytes =

Clinical data
- Trade names: Spherox
- Other names: Spherox 10-70 spheroids/cm^{2} implantation suspension, Chondrosphere
- Routes of administration: Intra-articular
- ATC code: M09AX02 (WHO)

Legal status
- Legal status: In general: ℞ (Prescription only)

Identifiers
- DrugBank: DB10997
- UNII: D5P3K3V822

Spheroids of human autologous matrix-associated chondrocytes, sold under the brand name Spherox, is a medication used to repair defects to the cartilage in the knee in adults who are experiencing knee pain and problems moving the knee. It is used where the affected area is no larger than 10 cm^{2} (1.6 sq in).

The most common side effects include arthralgia and joint effusion, which can cause swelling of the joint.

Spherox contains spheroids (spherical aggregates) of chondrocytes, cells found in healthy cartilage, that have been prepared from the patient's own tissues.

== Medical uses ==
Spherox is indicated for the repair of symptomatic articular cartilage defects of the femoral condyle and the patella of the knee (International Cartilage Repair Society [ICRS] grade III or IV) with defect sizes up to 10 cm^{2} (1.6 sq in) in adults.

To prepare the medicine, a small sample is taken by arthroscopy from the patient's cartilage in the knee. The cartilage cells are then grown in the laboratory to prepare a suspension of chondrocyte spheroids. During arthroscopy, the medicine is placed into the damaged area of the patient's cartilage. The chondrocyte spheroids attach to the cartilage within 20 minutes. People treated with Spherox should follow a specific rehabilitation program including physiotherapy. This allows the chondrocyte spheroids to fill in the cartilage defect.

== History ==
Spherox has been shown to improve symptoms and knee function in two studies in adults between 18 and 50 years of age. The main measure of effectiveness was the KOOS, which is graded on a scale of 0 to 100 (where 0 means severest symptoms and 100 means no symptoms). The KOOS was self-measured by participants rating the severity of their symptoms such as pain, impact on daily living, sport and recreational activities, and quality of life.

== See also ==
- Autologous chondrocyte implantation
- Knee cartilage replacement therapy
