= Medial meniscus =

Cartilage formation in the human knee

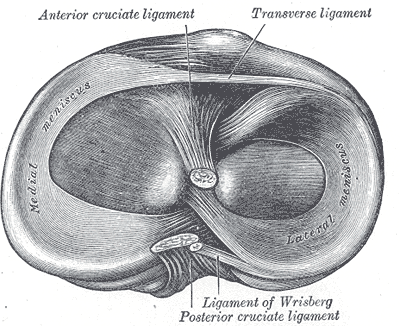
- Head of right tibia seen from above, showing menisci and attachments of ligaments. (Medial meniscus visible at left.)

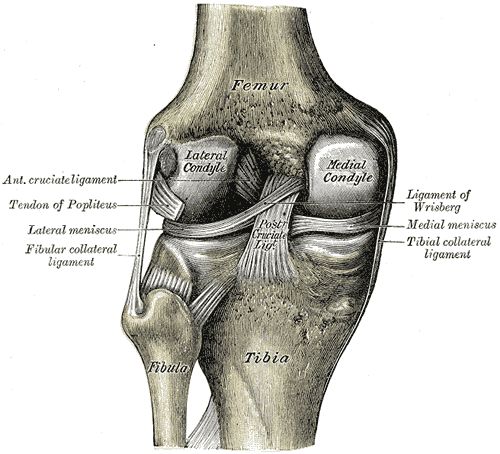
- Left knee joint from behind, showing interior ligaments.

Details

Identifiers
- Latin: meniscus medialis
- TA98: A03.6.08.005
- TA2: 1888
- FMA: 44620

The medial meniscus is a fibrocartilage semicircular band that spans the knee joint medially, located between the medial condyle of the femur and the medial condyle of the tibia. It is also referred to as the internal semilunar fibrocartilage. The medial meniscus has more of a crescent shape while the lateral meniscus is more circular. The anterior aspects of both menisci are connected by the transverse ligament. It is a common site of injury, especially if the knee is twisted.

== Structure ==
The meniscus attaches to the tibia via coronary ligaments.

Its anterior end, thin and pointed, is attached to the anterior intercondyloid fossa of the tibia, in front of the anterior cruciate ligament;

Its posterior end is fixed to the posterior intercondyloid fossa of the tibia, between the attachments of the lateral meniscus and the posterior cruciate ligament.

It is fused with the tibial collateral ligament which makes it far less mobile than the lateral meniscus. The points of attachment are relatively widely separated and, because the meniscus is wider posteriorly than anteriorly, the anterior crus is considerably thinner than the posterior crus. The greatest displacement of the meniscus is caused by external rotation, while internal rotation relaxes it.

During rotational movements of the tibia (with the knee flexed 90 degrees), the medial meniscus remains relatively fixed while the lateral part of the lateral meniscus is displaced across the tibial condyle below.

== Function ==
The medial meniscus separates the tibia and femur to decrease the contact area between the bones, and serves as a shock absorber reducing the peak contact force experienced. It also reduces friction between the two bones to allow smooth movement in the knee and distribute load during movement.

== Clinical significance ==
=== Injury ===
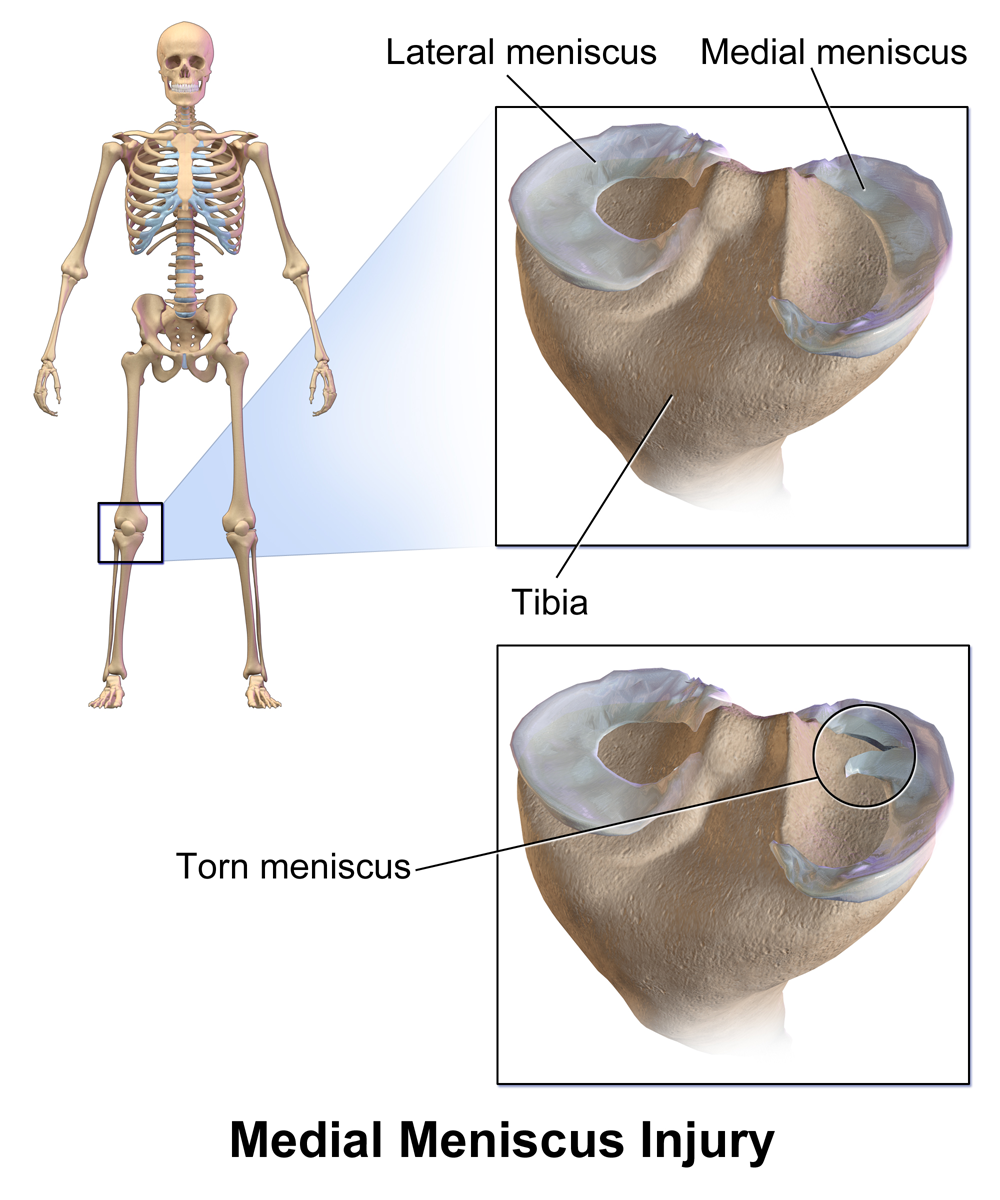
Medial meniscus injury

Acute injury to the medial meniscus frequently accompanies an injury to the ACL (anterior cruciate ligament) or MCL (medial collateral ligament). A person occasionally injures the medial meniscus without harming the ligaments. Healing of the medial meniscus is generally not possible unless the patient is very young, usually <15 years old. Damage to the outer third of the meniscus has the best healing potential because of the blood supply, but the inner two thirds of the medial meniscus has a limited blood supply and thus limited healing ability. Large tears to the meniscus may require surgical repair or removal. In terms of a meniscus tear, the doctor can categorize the injury in a plethora of ways. For example, a tear on the outer edge of the meniscus has great chance of healing. Doctors call this site the “red zone” because this outer portion of the meniscus is highly vascularized; therefore, it receives the amount of nutrients and support needed for a successful recovery. Conversely, the inner two-thirds of the meniscus are called the “white zone.” This portion of the meniscus is not highly vascularized; it receives its nourishment from only the synovial fluid via diffusion. Considering these facts, doctors consider different treatments to different kinds of tears:

If the meniscus has to be removed (meniscectomy) because of injury (either because it cannot heal or because the damage is too severe), the patient has an increased risk of developing osteoarthritis in the knee later in life. If the meniscus is removed and there is no arthritis, there are now meniscus transplant options if the patient is young and has normal alignment.

More chronic injury occurs with osteoarthritis, made worse by obesity and high-impact activity. The medial meniscus and the medial compartment are more commonly affected than the lateral compartment.

Often, moderate to severe injury or injury past early middle age to the meniscus will indicate a total knee replacement.

== See also ==
- meniscus
- tear of meniscus
- cartilage
- unhappy triad
- meniscal cartilage replacement therapy

== Additional images ==
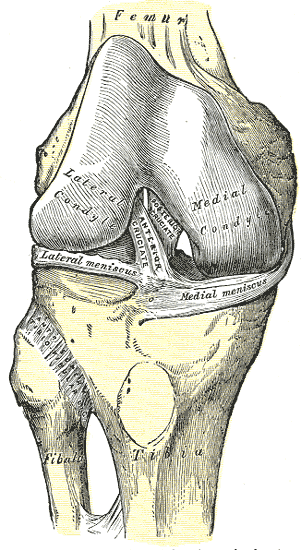
Right knee-joint, from the front, showing interior ligaments.

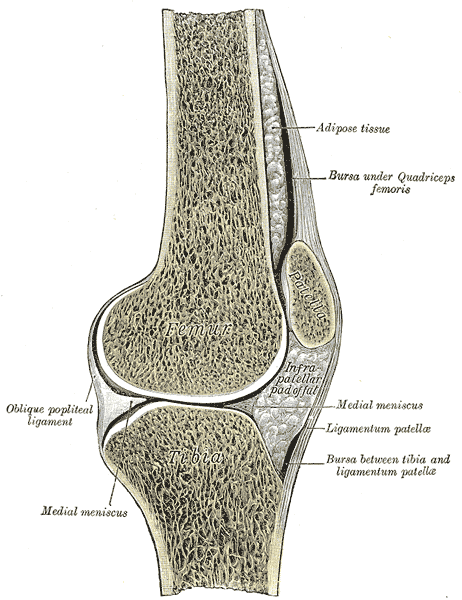
Sagittal section of right knee-joint.

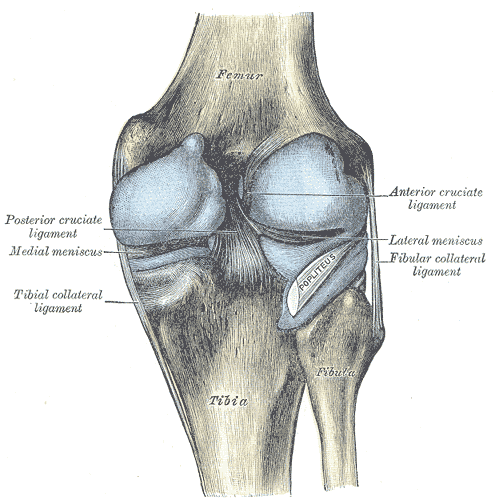
Capsule of right knee-joint (distended). Posterior aspect.

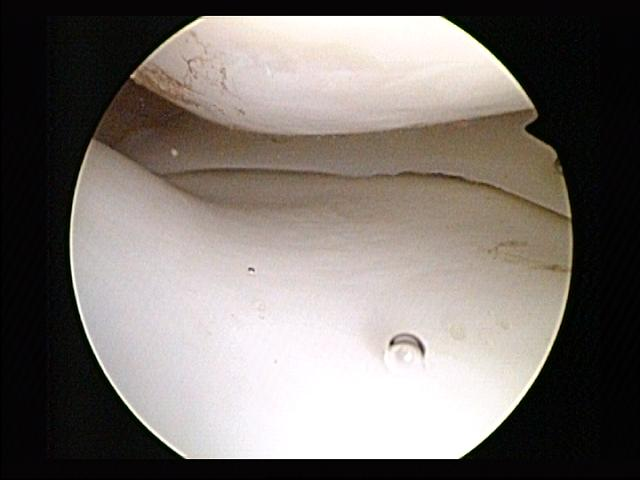
Normal medial meniscus

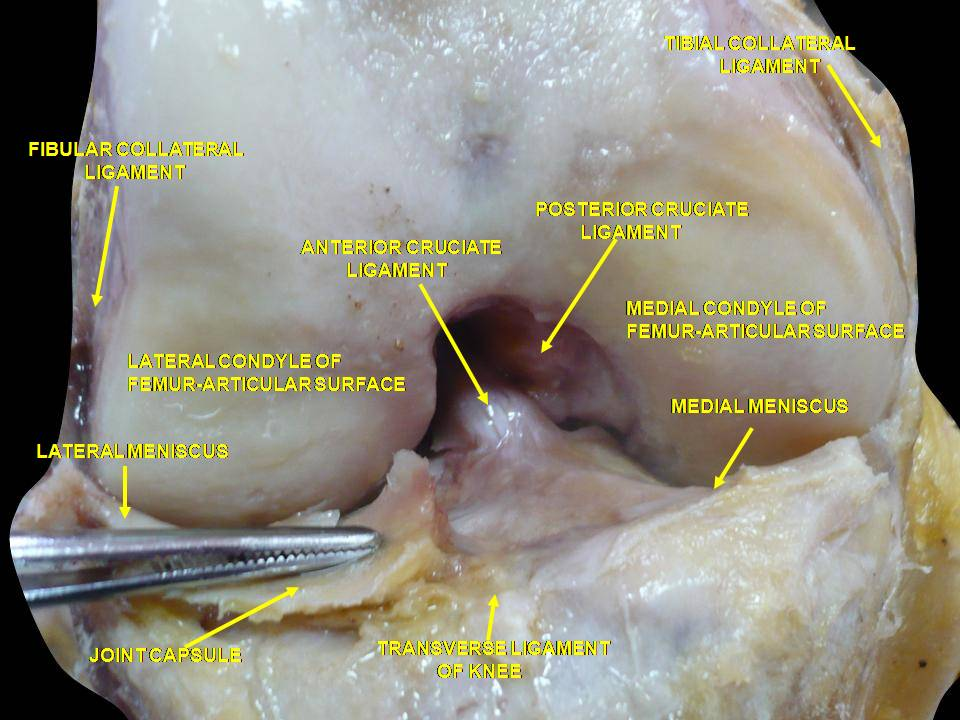
Anterior view of knee.

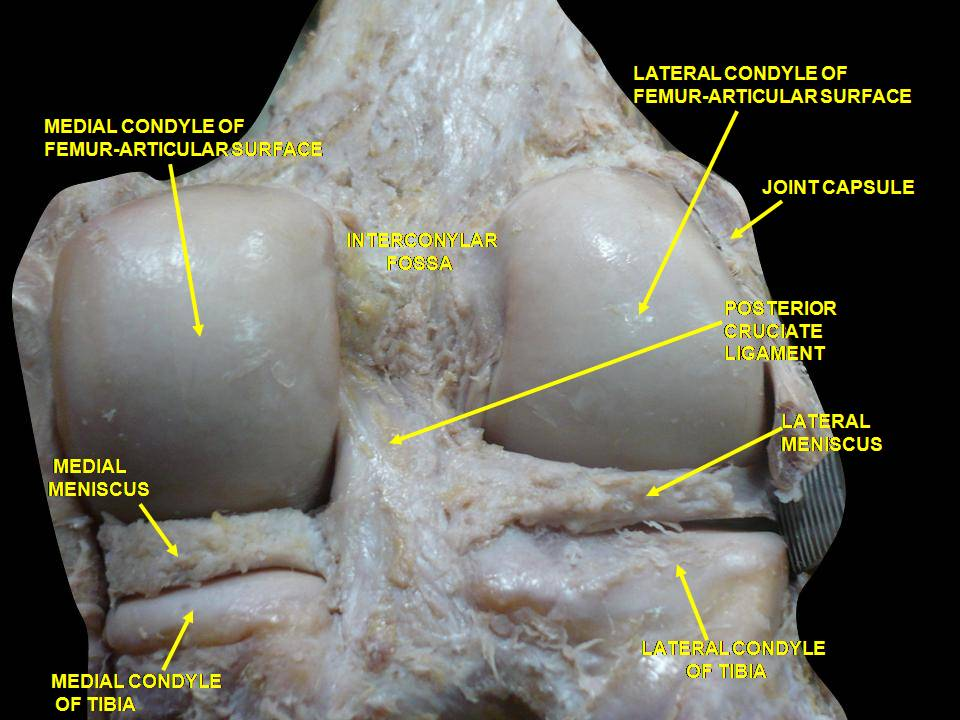
Right knee in extension. Deep dissection. Posterior view.

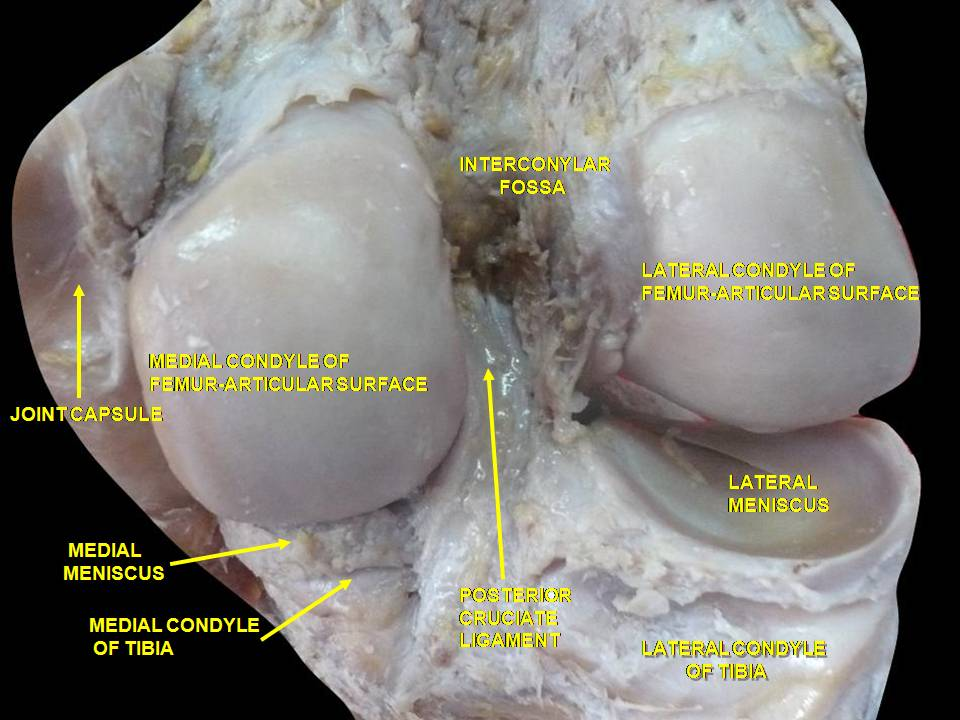
Right knee in extension. Deep dissection. Posterior view.

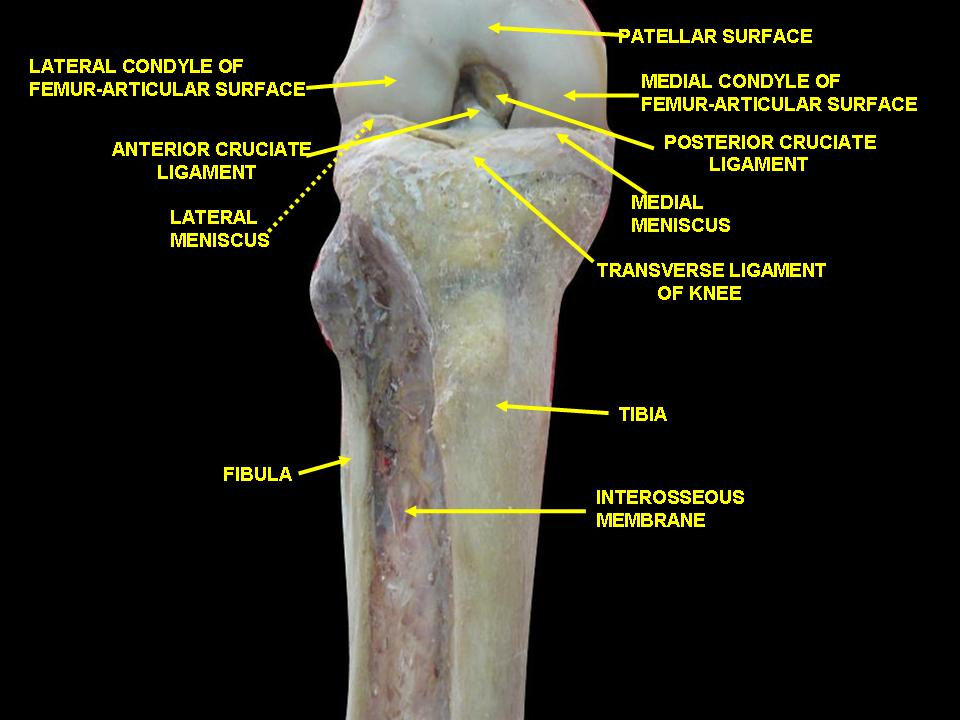
Knee and tibiofibular joint. Deep dissection. Anterior view.

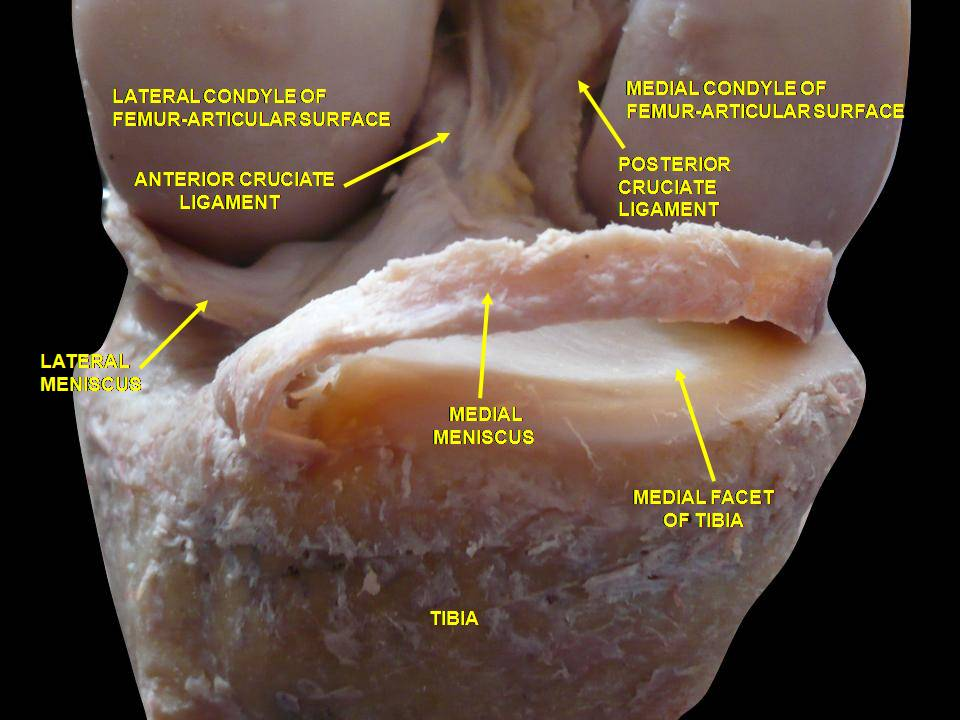
Knee joint. Deep dissection. Anterior view

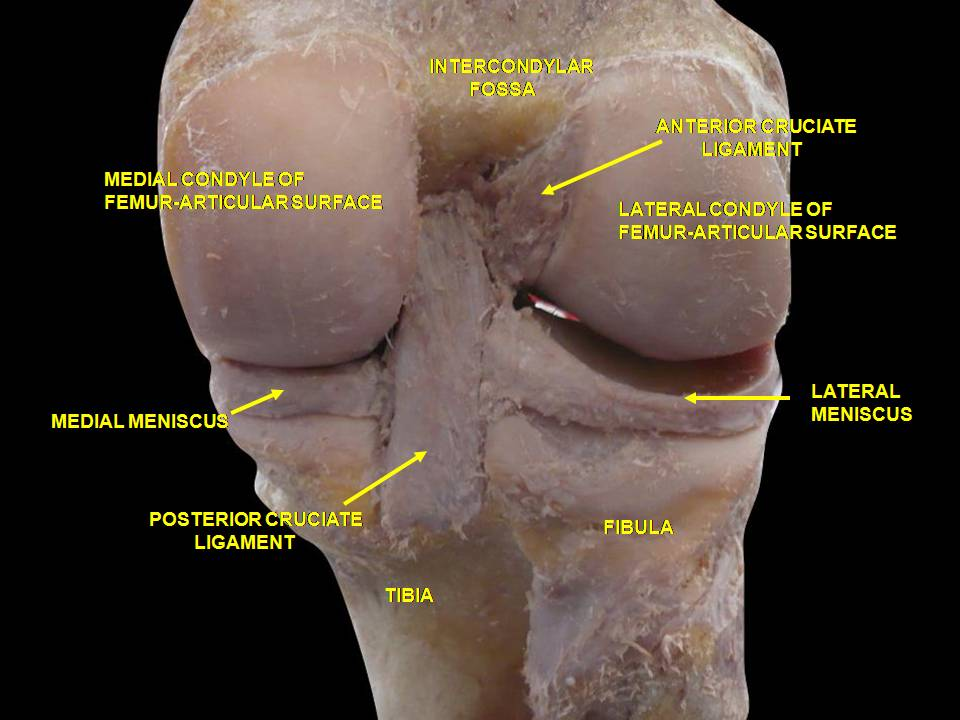
Knee joint. Deep dissection. Posterior view
