= Anterior meniscofemoral ligament =

Ligament of the knee

Details
- From: Lateral meniscus
- To: Anterior cruciate ligament

Identifiers
- Latin: ligamentum meniscofemorale anterius
- TA98: A03.6.08.003
- TA2: 1886
- FMA: 76854

The anterior meniscofemoral ligament (ligament of Humphry) is a small fibrous band of the knee joint. It arises from the posterior horn of the lateral meniscus and passes superiorly and medially in front of the posterior cruciate ligament to attach to the lateral surface of medial condyle of the femur.

Anterior meniscofemoral ligament is found in 11.8% of the subjects during MRI scan of the knee.

It may be confused for the posterior cruciate ligament during arthroscopy. In this situation, a tug on the ligament while observing for motion of the lateral meniscus can be used to tell the two apart.

Anterior meniscofemoral ligament, together with posterior meniscofemoral ligament, meniscotibial ligament, and the popliteomeniscal fascicles, stabilises the posterolateral part of the lateral meniscus.
