= Meniscus (anatomy) =

Fibrocartilaginous part of a bone joint

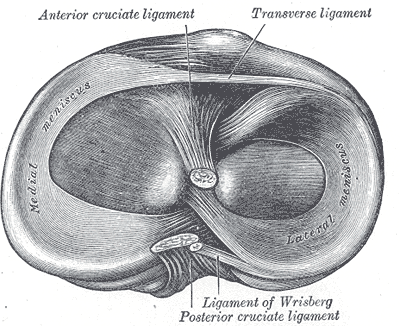
- Head of right tibia seen from above, showing menisci and attachments of ligaments

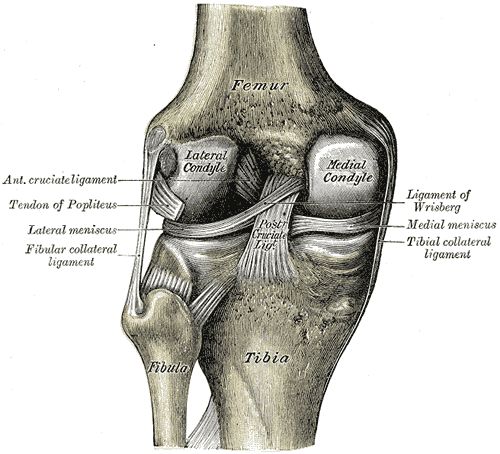
- Left knee-joint from behind, showing interior ligaments

Details

Identifiers
- Latin: meniscus
- Greek: μηνίσκος ("meniskos")
- MeSH: D000072600
- TA98: A03.0.00.033
- TA2: 1544

A meniscus (pl.: menisci or meniscuses) is a crescent-shaped fibrocartilaginous anatomical structure that, in contrast to an articular disc, only partly divides a joint cavity. In humans, menisci are present in the knee, wrist, acromioclavicular, sternoclavicular, and temporomandibular joints.

Generally, the term "meniscus" is used to refer to the cartilage of the knee, either to the lateral or medial meniscus. Both are cartilaginous tissues that provide structural integrity to the knee when it undergoes tension and torsion.

The menisci are also known as "semi-lunar" cartilages, referring to their half-moon, crescent shape.

== Etymology ==
The term meniscus derives from Greek μηνίσκος meniskos, meaning "crescent", and was first used in English around 1690. The word was used in reference to a lens that is concave on one side and convex on the opposite side.

== Structure ==
The menisci of the knee are two pads of fibrocartilaginous tissue covering about 70% of the articular surface, serving to disperse friction and absorb weight in the knee joint between the lower leg (tibia) and the thigh (femur). They are concave on the top and flat on the bottom, articulating with and attached to the tibial plateau, and are thicker laterally.

=== Attachments ===
The menisci are attached to the small depressions (fossae) between the condyles of the tibia (intercondyloid fossa), and towards the center from the rim of the bone by insertional ligaments.

The outer edges of the medial meniscus are attached to the joint capsule and medial collateral ligament. Ligamental attachments to the tibial plateau also exist from the anterior and posterior horns of the menisci, and from the anterior edges of the menisci by the transverse intermeniscal ligament. The posterior horn of the lateral meniscus connects via insertional ligaments to the femur and the popliteus tendon.

=== Vascular supply ===
The meniscus has a limited peripheral blood supply from the medial, lateral, and middle geniculate arteries (branches of the popliteal artery) which perfuse the inferior and superior aspects of each meniscus. The blood flow courses from the periphery (outside) toward the center, decreases with age, and is mostly absent by adulthood, impeding recovery from injury.

Capillaries arising from these arteries originate along the periphery of the menisci. Each meniscus is also nourished by synovial fluid via diffusion or mechanical pumping, such as during joint motion.

== Function ==
The menisci serve diverse biomechanical functions, participating in load transmission and shock absorption to stabilize the knee, nutrition, joint lubrication, and proprioception.

The menisci mainly act to disperse the weight of the body and reduce friction during movement. Since the condyles of the femur and tibia meet at one point (which changes during flexion and extension), the menisci spread the load of the body's weight.

== Clinical significance ==
=== Injury ===
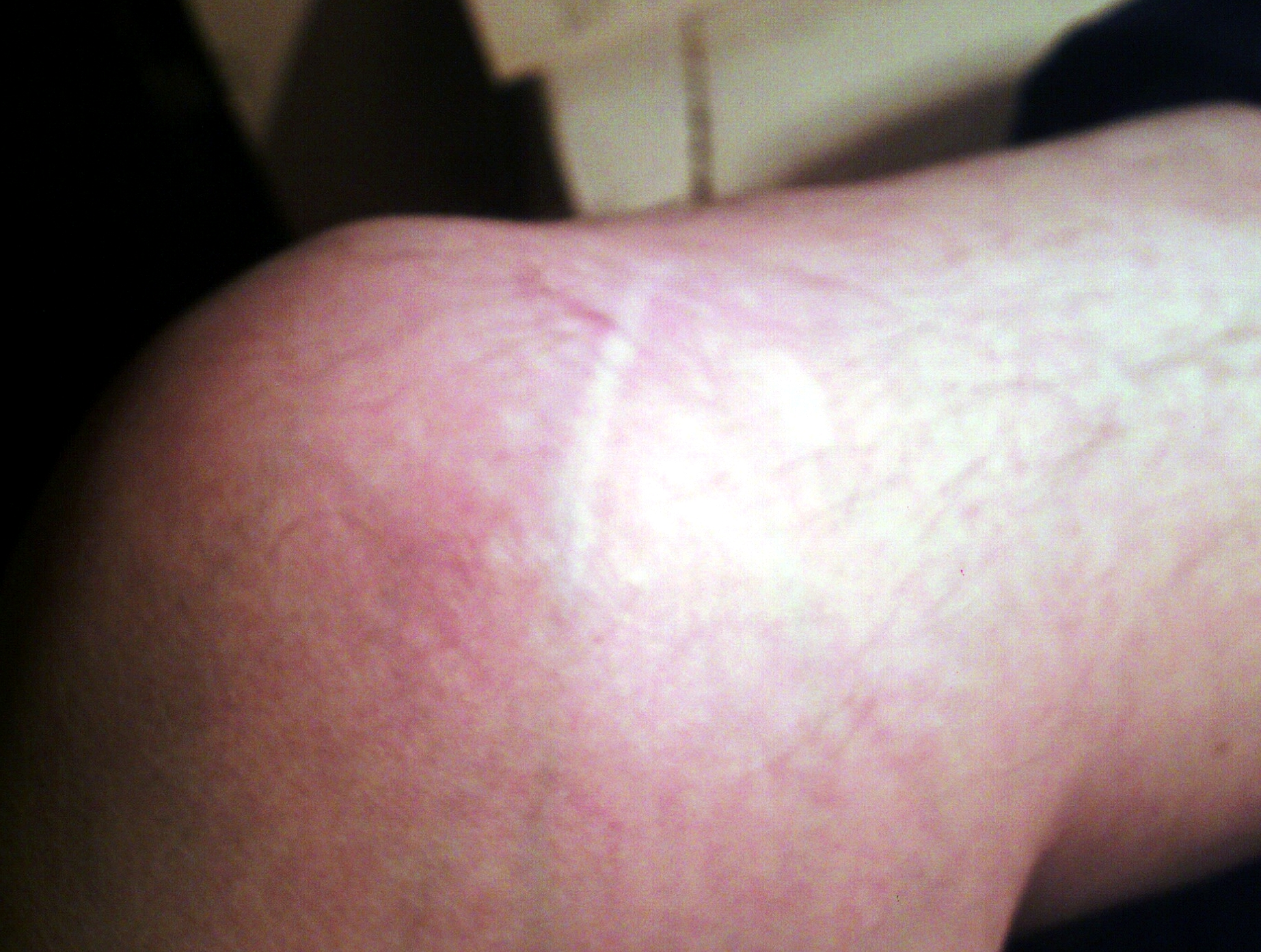
Scar from partial left meniscectomy in 1980 (c. 30 years before photo); more recent surgery leaves smaller scars.

In sports and orthopedics, people sometimes speak of "torn cartilage" and will actually be referring to an injury to one of the menisci. There are two general types of meniscus injuries: acute tears which are often the result of trauma or a sports injury, and chronic or wear-and-tear type tears. Acute tears have many different shapes (vertical, horizontal, radial, oblique, complex) and sizes. Injuries to the menisci are a cause of substantial dysfunction of the knee and leg in normal walking and in sports participation.

Meniscus injuries are often treated with surgical repair depending upon the person's age as they rarely heal on their own. Chronic tears are treated symptomatically: physical therapy with or without the addition of injections and anti-inflammatory medications. If the tear causes continued pain, swelling, or knee dysfunction, then the tear can be removed or repaired surgically.

The unhappy triad is a set of commonly co-occurring knee injuries which includes injury to the medial or lateral meniscus, anterior cruciate ligament, and medial collateral ligament.

=== Magnetic resonance imaging ===
Magnetic resonance imaging (MRI) is a noninvasive diagnostic procedure used to evaluate the anatomical state of a meniscus, typically following a rotating knee injury. MRI is widely accepted as an optimal imaging tool because of its clarity for visualizing soft tissue in contrast to bone.

On cross-section with MRI, the normal meniscus appears with a uniform, dark gray-like appearance, whereas a meniscal tear gives a darker signal within the meniscus.

=== Conservative management ===
Conservative management is often considered first for a smaller or chronic tear that does not appear to require arthroscopic surgery, although arthroscopy may not provide a more satisfactory outcome than exercise therapy. Physical therapy is used both in conservative management for a minor injury and after surgery.

=== Surgical treatment ===
Two surgeries of the meniscus are most common. Depending on the type and location of the tear, the person's age, and physician's preference, injured menisci are usually either repaired or removed, in part or completely (meniscectomy). Each has its advantages and disadvantages. Many studies show the meniscus serves a purpose and therefore doctors will attempt to repair it when possible. However, the meniscus has poor blood supply, and, therefore, healing can be difficult. Traditionally it was thought that if there is no chance of healing, then it is best to remove the damaged and non-functional meniscus, although at least one study has shown that there is little significance if a meniscectomy is done for a degenerative tear. However, resuming high-intensity activities may be impossible without surgery as the tear may cause the knee to lock.

A 2017 clinical practice guideline strongly recommends against surgery in nearly all people with degenerative knee disease.

== Gallery ==
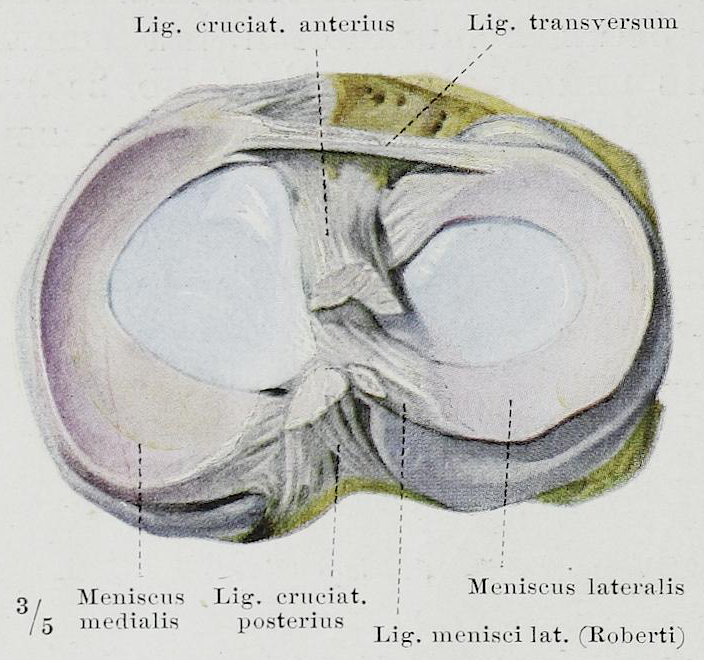

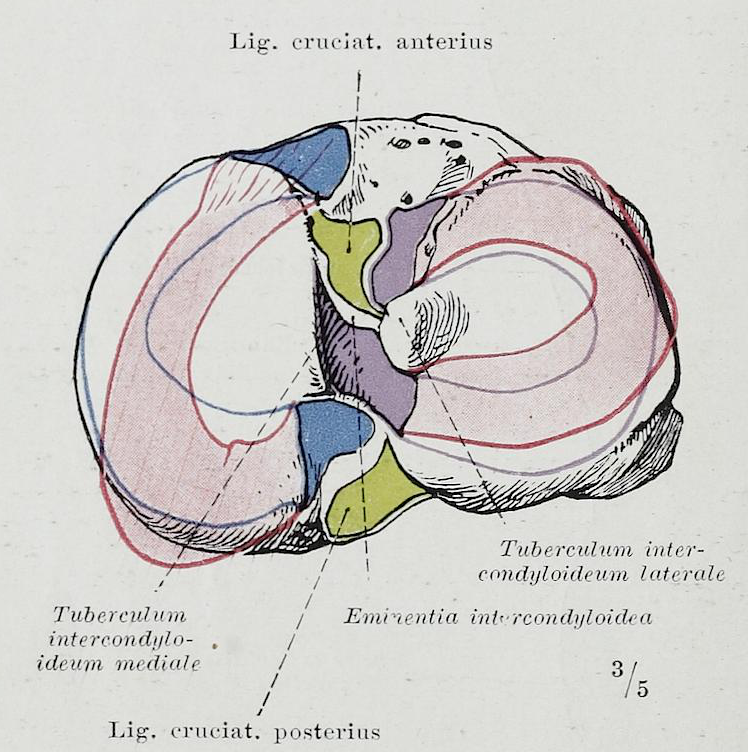

== See also ==
- Meniscal cartilage replacement therapy
- Discoid meniscus
- Anterior cruciate ligament
- Meniscus transplant
