= Meniscus transplant =

Type of knee surgery

- Other names: Meniscal transplant
- Specialty: Orthopedic

A meniscus transplant or meniscal transplant is a transplant of the meniscus of the knee, which separates the thigh bone (femur) from the lower leg bone (tibia). The worn or damaged meniscus is removed and is replaced with a new one from a donor. The meniscus to be transplanted is taken from a cadaver, and, as such, is known as an allograft. Meniscal transplantation is technically difficult, as it must be sized accurately for each person, positioned properly and secured to the tibial plateau. Its success also depends on donor compatibility, stability of the transplant, and long-term health of the underlying articular cartilage.

== Background ==
Each knee has an inside (medial) and an outside (lateral) meniscus. The menisci play several key roles that are vital in maintaining the health of the knee. Specifically, they act as shock absorbers and load sharers, increase the stability of the knee, and provide lubrication and nutrition to the bearing surface (articular cartilage) of the knee.

They were once thought of as vestigial structures that served no real purpose. If injured and problematic, they were routinely excised through a procedure called meniscectomy. It is now known that a knee joint without healthy menisci is at significantly increased risk of developing wear and tear arthritis (post-traumatic or osteoarthritis). The arthritis is a result of the increased contact forces and shear that results from loss of shock absorption and stability after meniscectomy. For this reason, current surgical strategies are focused on preserving as much of the meniscus as possible or replacing it if necessary.

Certain meniscal tears are repairable with sutures, predominantly those that are freshly torn and involve healthy tissue. The closer the tear is to the peripheral blood supply the higher the likelihood of successful repair. Patients with unrepairable meniscal injuries usually have symptoms of pain, catching, swelling or locking in the knee. The surgeon may perform a partial or complete meniscectomy to alleviate the symptoms in the short-term. The more meniscal tissue removed, the higher the likelihood of subsequently developing arthritis. Recognizing the biomechanical importance of the menisci, surgeons in the late 1980s proposed meniscus transplantation and meniscus reconstruction as two new surgical options for the patient with a meniscus deficient knee.

Recognizing from experiments performed by R.J. Webber, PhD that meniscus cells have the ability to grow in tissue culture, K.R. Stone, M.D. developed the first meniscus reconstruction device called a collagen regeneration template in 1986. The template or scaffold was composed of glycosaminoglycan (sugar/proteins that make up cartilage tissue) and was designed to have pores into which cells could grow. Its cross-linking preserved the scaffold in the knee joint long enough for new meniscus tissue to grow into it. (Patents 5,158,574, 5,116,374, 5,007,934) This scaffold was tested in animals and subsequently in people and was found to successfully replace lost segments of meniscus tissue (Fig 1). It became widely available in Europe and temporarily in the US in 2009. However, in cases where large areas of meniscus are missing, full intact meniscus transplantation has been suggested.

== Indications for meniscus transplantation ==
Most people who are meniscus deficient already have some arthritic changes in their knee. Early reports of meniscus transplantation done in arthritic knees suggested a higher incidence of transplantation failure if the irregular cartilage surfaces were not simultaneously addressed with cartilage grafting techniques. Therefore, the standard orthopaedic literature recommended that meniscus transplantation be performed in meniscus deficient patients only if they are young and free from arthritis of the knee. The most recently published indications for meniscal transplantation include:

- Prior meniscectomy
- Age ≤ 50 years
- Pain in the meniscectomized tibiofemoral compartment
- No radiographic evidence of advanced joint deterioration
- ≥ 2mm of tibiofemoral joint space on 45 degrees weight-bearing posteroanterior radiographs
- No or only minimal bone exposed on tibiofemoral surfaces
- Normal axial alignment

In the same textbook, contraindications are listed as:

- Advanced knee joint arthrosis (flattening of the femoral condyle, concavity of the tibial plateau, osteophytes that prevent anatomic seating of the meniscus transplant)
- Uncorrected varus or valgus axial malalignment
- Uncorrected knee joint instability
- Anterior cruciate ligament deficiency
- Knee arthrofibrosis
- Significant muscular atrophy
- Prior joint infection with subsequent arthrosis
- Symptomatic noteworthy patellofemoral articular cartilage deterioration
- Obesity (body mass index > 30)
- Prophylactic procedure (asymptomatic patient with no articular cartilage damage)

=== Debate of indications ===
Many orthopaedists have challenged these contraindications and have advocated meniscal transplantation, in conjunction with cartilage repair, ACL reconstruction or osteotomy in patients with evidence of arthritic deterioration, instability or malalignment. One paper demonstrated that results of meniscus transplantation in patients with arthritic changes were similar to that of previous reports of meniscus transplantation in patients without arthritic changes, so long as articular cartilage defects were addressed at the time of surgery. In the same paper, the success of meniscus transplantation was not affected by mal-alignment.

== Meniscus transplant preparations ==
=== Meniscus tissue processing ===
Meniscal allograft processing, sterilization and storage procedures vary from center to center. Some surgeons, particularly in Europe, prefer to harvest the meniscal graft themselves in a sterile fashion and use them when they are fresh, usually within two weeks of procurement. On the other hand, some American centers harvest the graft outside of a sterile operating room environment and then perform a sterilization wash. These grafts are then packaged and frozen at -80 °C, until they are to be transplanted. To decrease the risk of disease transmission, irradiating the graft has been used in the past to enhance sterilization. However, it has been shown to degrade most collagen-based tissues and the meniscus is particularly susceptible. Tissue preservation techniques such as cryo-preservation and freeze-drying have shown little benefit and have generally been abandoned except by a few tissue banks.

=== Meniscus tissue sizing ===
Matching the size of the donor knee to the size of the recipient knee is crucial for successful meniscus transplantation. Studies by Pollard et al. noted the radiographic (x-ray) measurements provided an indication of meniscus size based on the width of the tibial plateau. However, inherent variability in both the positioning of the knee and the direction of the x-ray beam, as well as human error contribute to some inaccuracy of these measurements. Sizing has been made more accurate with the use of MRI. Matching by sex, height, and weight has been shown to be nearly as accurate as radiographic techniques (0.72 correlation of height to tibial width) and has been adopted by a number of centers.

== Surgical technique ==
Various meniscal transplant techniques have been described, all of which are considered surgically demanding. All involve arthroscopy and some require open surgery, as well. Some surgeons leave the allograft anchored to its bony attachments and fix these bone bridges or plugs into size matched slots, troughs or holes. Other surgeons use tunnels through which they pass sutures that hold the allograft in place. Additional sutures are also used to attach the allograft to the remnant of native meniscus. Important points include obtaining stable and anatomic fixation of the horns of the meniscus and securing the meniscus rim to the tibia. Securing the graft in this way preserves the hoop (concentric) stresses of the meniscus. Meniscus extrusion or shrinking has been noted and may be in part a function of sewing the meniscus too tightly to the synovium rather than restoring the meniscus tibial ligamentous attachments.

== Post-op meniscus transplantation programs ==
Post-operatively, meniscus transplant patients enter specific rehabilitation programs, aimed at decreasing pain and swelling, optimizing range of motion and strength, while avoiding injury to the healing meniscal allograft. Most patients are allowed partial weight bearing in extension immediately as it stabilizes the meniscus on the surface of the tibia.

== Results ==
Multiple articles report the results of meniscal transplantation. Unfortunately, because these studies are mainly uncontrolled, retrospective case series, drawing conclusions regarding meniscal transplantation is difficult. No study has compared meniscus deficient patients who received meniscal transplantation with those who did not. Designing and conducting a study in this way is difficult. A recent systematic review of the literature determined that "good early and midterm results of cryo-preserved or fresh-frozen, non-irradiated meniscal allograft transplantation can be achieved in a relatively young patient with only mild chondromalacia (lower than Outerbridge grade 3) [cartilage degeneration] who is not overweight and has a stable, mechanically aligned lower extremity, if the allograft is sized radiographically by use of anteroposterior and lateral films and the allograft meniscal horns have bony attachments and are fixed by bony techniques..." However, Stone et al. published long-term results of meniscus transplantation with simultaneous repair of the articular cartilage and demonstrated a mean estimated procedure survival time of 9.9 years. Significant improvements in pain relief, activity, and function were found over the course of follow-up indicating patients improve significantly within the first two years after surgery and that these improvements are maintained over time.

== Controversies ==
There is a lack of consensus between surgeons in key areas of meniscal transplantation. Questions remain concerning indications, long-term efficacy, as well as allograft sizing, processing and fixation techniques. Most surgeons, however, agree that meniscal transplantation seems to afford at least short- to medium-term benefit.

Meniscal transplantation is a novel surgical technique designed to improve the biology and biomechanics of a meniscus deficient knee. Improvements in short-term and long-term subjective and objective outcome measures have been demonstrated.
