= Posterior meniscofemoral ligament =

Ligament of the knee

Details
- From: lateral meniscus
- To: femur

Identifiers
- Latin: ligamentum meniscofemorale posterius
- TA98: A03.6.08.004
- TA2: 1887
- FMA: 76855

The posterior meniscofemoral ligament (also known as the ligament of Wrisberg) is a small fibrous band of the knee joint. It attaches to the posterior area of the lateral meniscus and crosses superiorly and medially behind the posterior cruciate ligament to attach to the medial condyle of the femur.

It forms with articulatio meniscolateralis anterior articulatio mesicofemoralis which is the upper floor of articulatio genus. It flexes and extends functionally as ginglymus with frontal axis.

The posterior meniscofemoral ligament is found in 64.4% of the subjects in MRI scan of the knee.

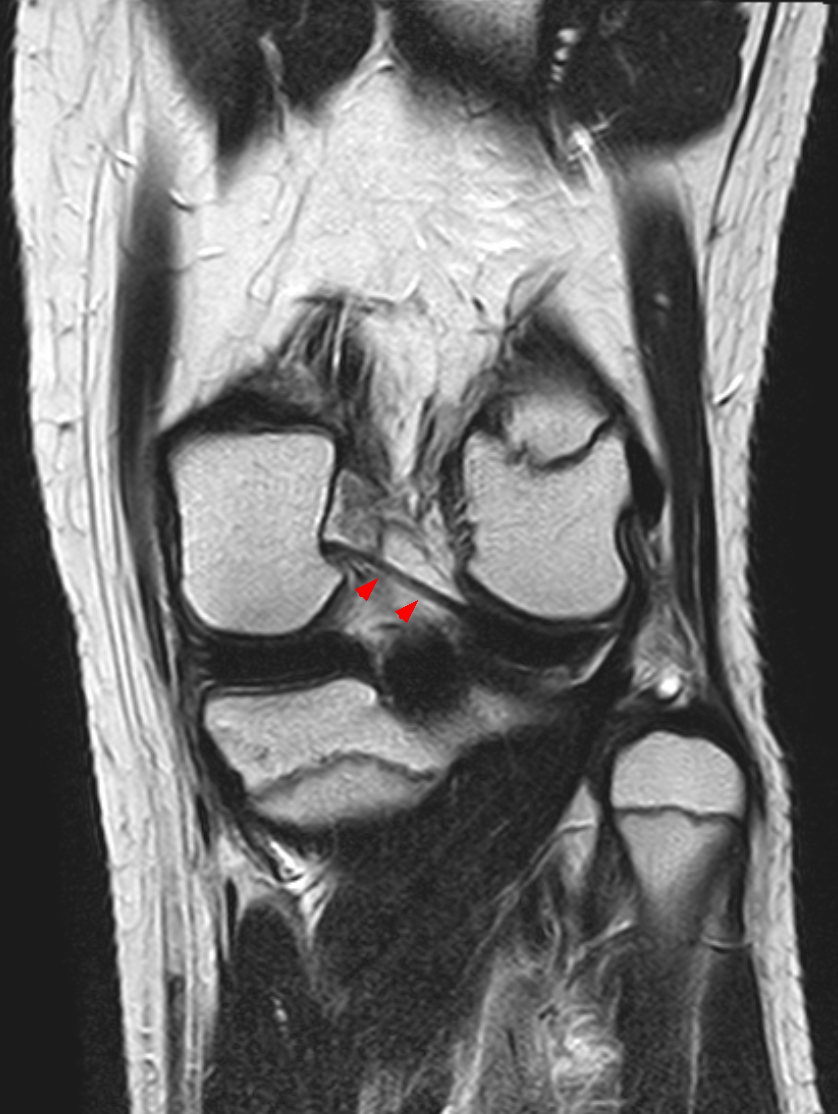
Posterior meniscofemoral ligament on MRI, coronal

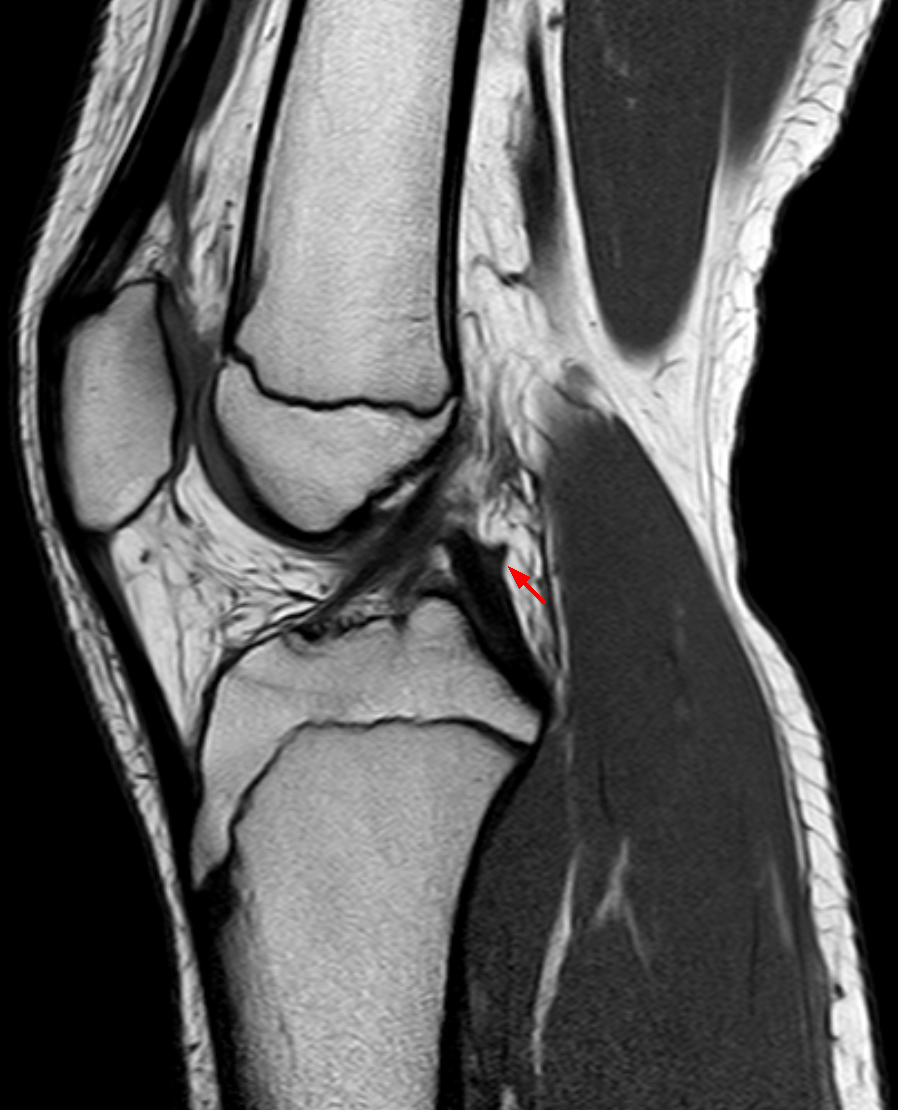
Posterior meniscofemoral ligament on MRI, sagittal

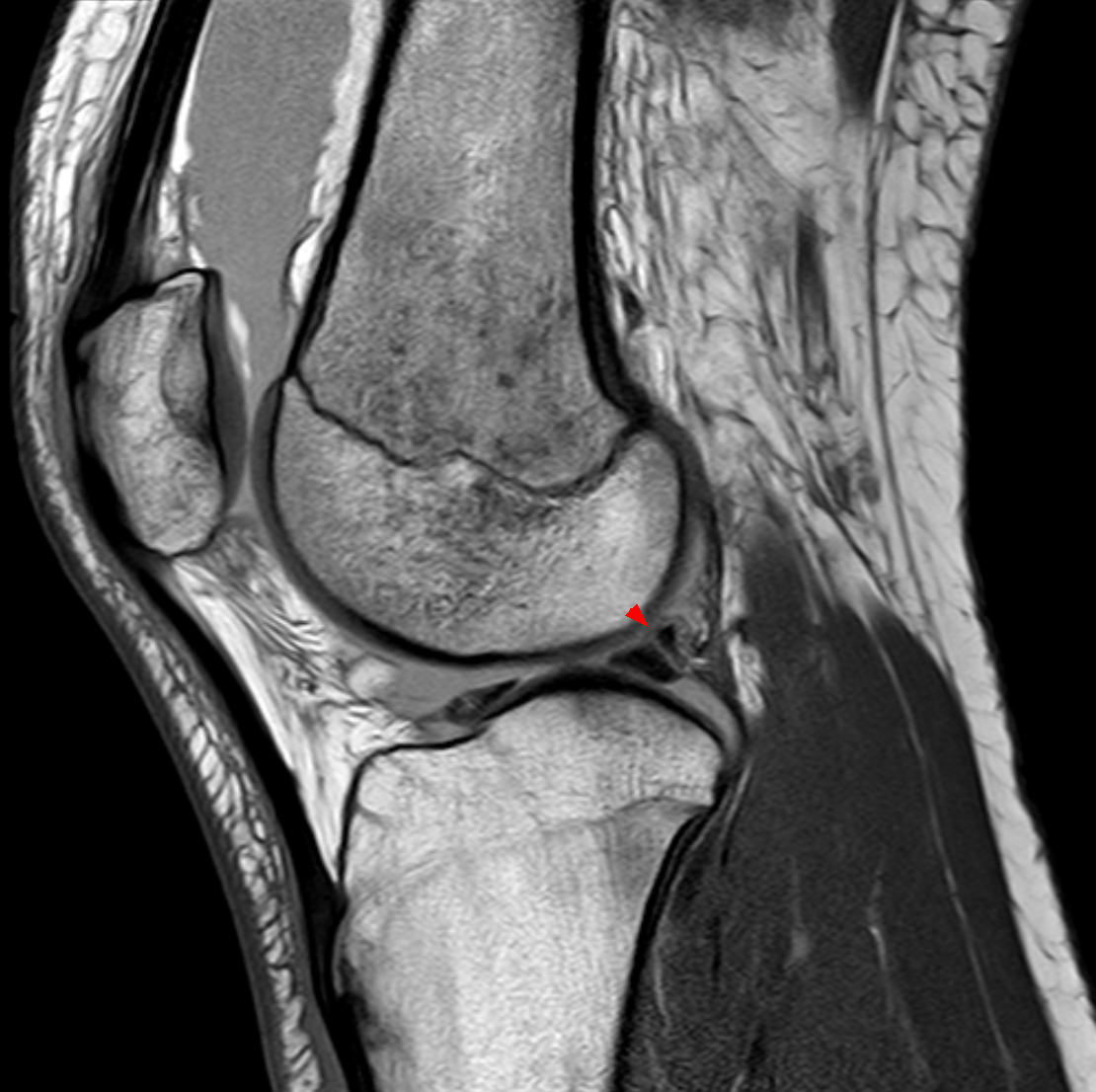
Posterior meniscofemoral ligament (Wrisberg) behind the posterior horn of the lateral meniscus close to its insertion. Sometimes wrongly interpreted as a meniscal tear.
