= Lateral meniscus =

Fibrocartilaginous band of the knee

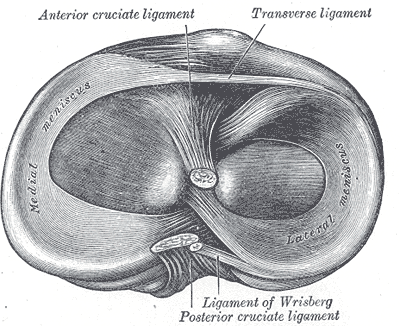
- Head of right tibia seen from above, showing menisci and attachments of ligaments.

Details

Identifiers
- Latin: meniscus lateralis
- TA98: A03.6.08.002
- TA2: 1885
- FMA: 44631

The lateral meniscus (external semilunar fibrocartilage) is a fibrocartilaginous band that spans the lateral side of the interior of the knee joint. It is one of two menisci of the knee, the other being the medial meniscus. It is nearly circular and covers a larger portion of the articular surface than the medial. It can occasionally be injured or torn by twisting the knee or applying direct force, as seen in contact sports.

== Structure ==
The lateral meniscus is grooved laterally for the tendon of the popliteus, which separates it from the fibular collateral ligament.

Its anterior end is attached in front of the intercondyloid eminence of the tibia, lateral to, and behind, the anterior cruciate ligament, with which it blends; the posterior end is attached behind the intercondyloid eminence of the tibia and in front of the posterior end of the medial meniscus.

The anterior attachment of the lateral meniscus is twisted on itself so that its free margin looks backward and upward, its anterior end resting on a sloping shelf of bone on the front of the lateral process of the intercondyloid eminence.

Close to its posterior attachment it sends off a strong fasciculus, the ligament of Wrisberg, which passes upward and medialward, to be inserted into the medial condyle of the femur, immediately behind the attachment of the posterior cruciate ligament.

The lateral meniscus gives off from its anterior convex margin a fasciculus which forms the transverse ligament.

=== Variation ===
Occasionally a small fasciculus passes forward to be inserted into the lateral part of the anterior cruciate ligament.

== Clinical significance ==
The lateral meniscus is less likely to be injured or torn than the medial meniscus. Diagnosis of lateral meniscus tear is done with McMurray's test. If a tear is detected, treatment depends on the type and size of the tear. Small tears can be treated conservatively, with rest, ice, and pain medications until the pain is under control, then exercise may be started with gradually increasing intensity, to improve range of motion and decrease swelling. More severe tears of the lateral meniscus require surgical repair or removal, which can often be done arthroscopically. Swelling and stiffness of the knee can occur when you have a torn lateral meniscus.

== Additional images ==
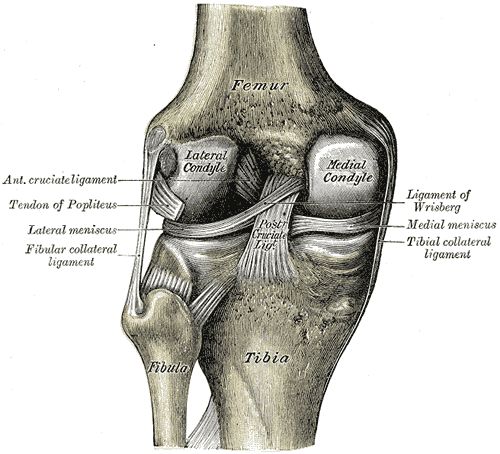
Left knee joint from behind, showing interior ligaments.

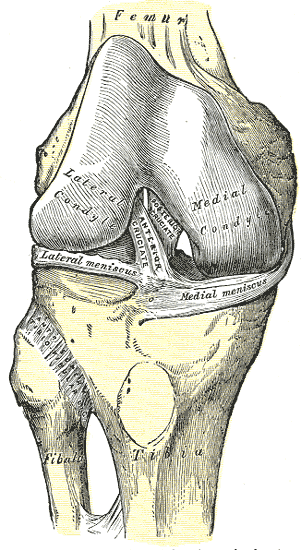
Right knee-joint, from the front, showing interior ligaments.

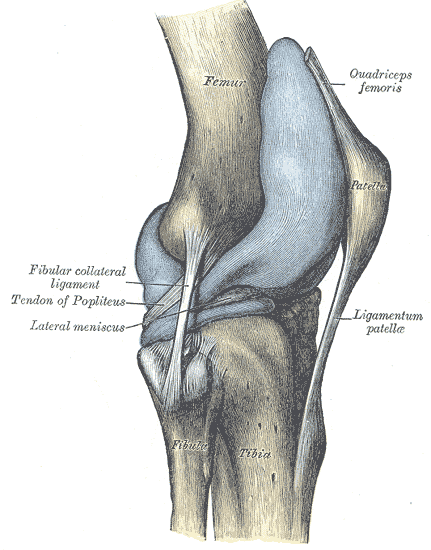
Capsule of right knee-joint (distended). Lateral aspect.

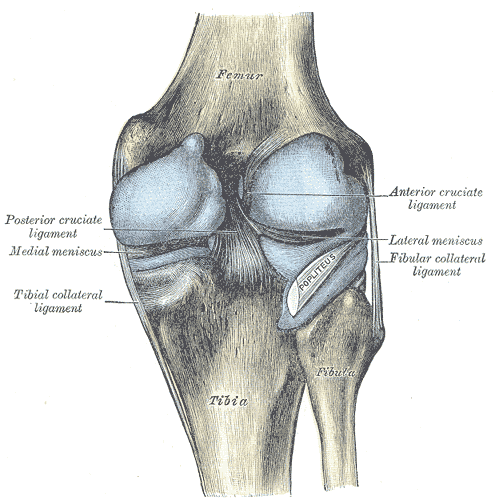
Capsule of right knee-joint (distended). Posterior aspect.

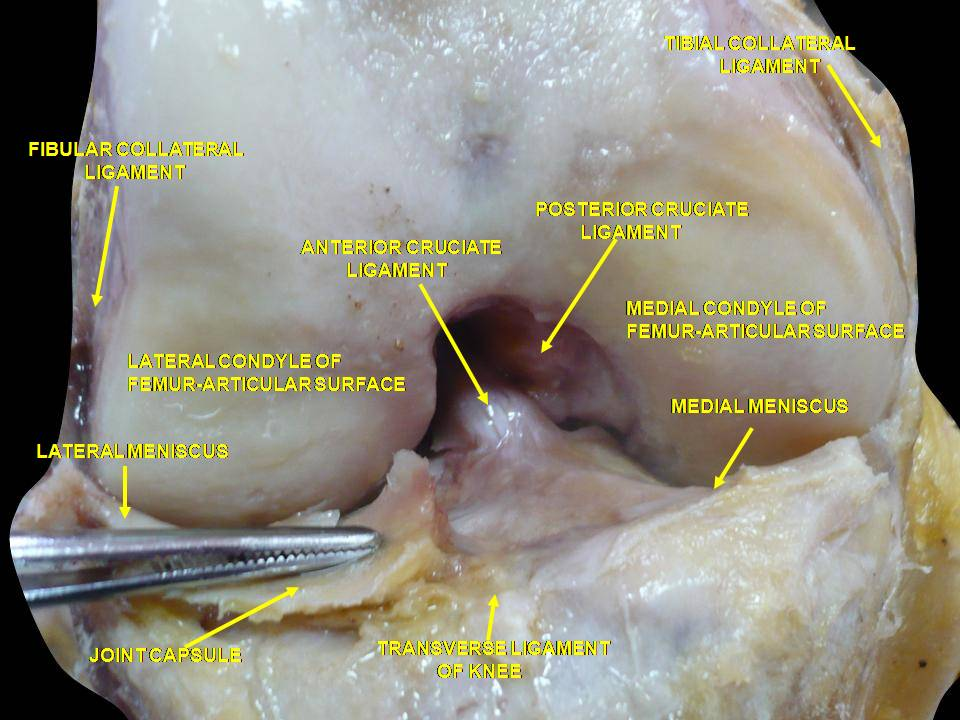
Anterior view of knee.

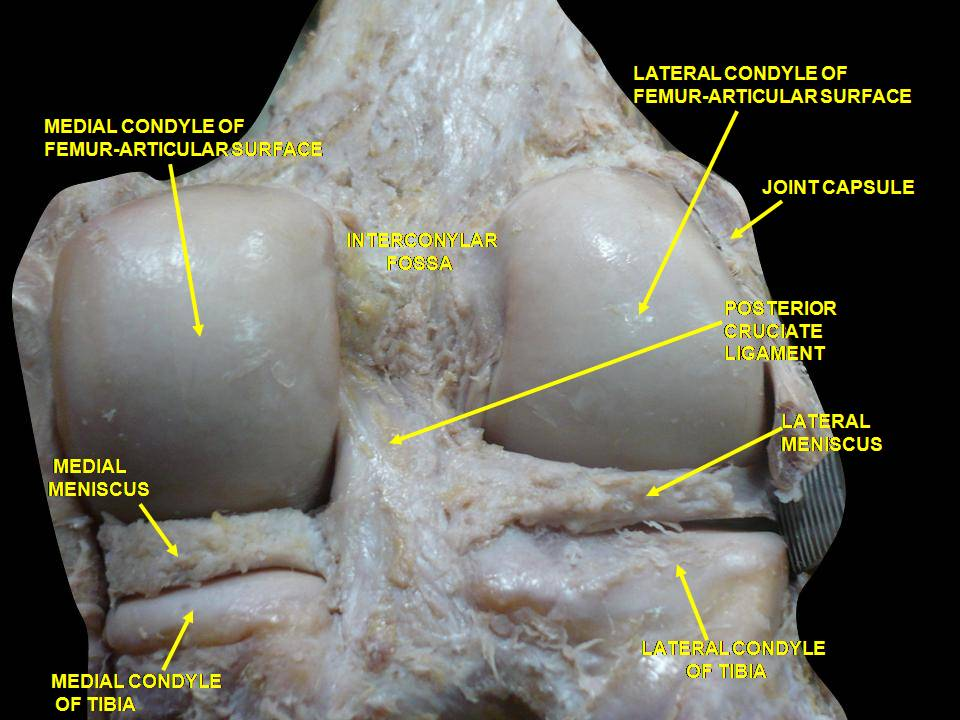
Right knee in extension. Deep dissection. Posterior view.

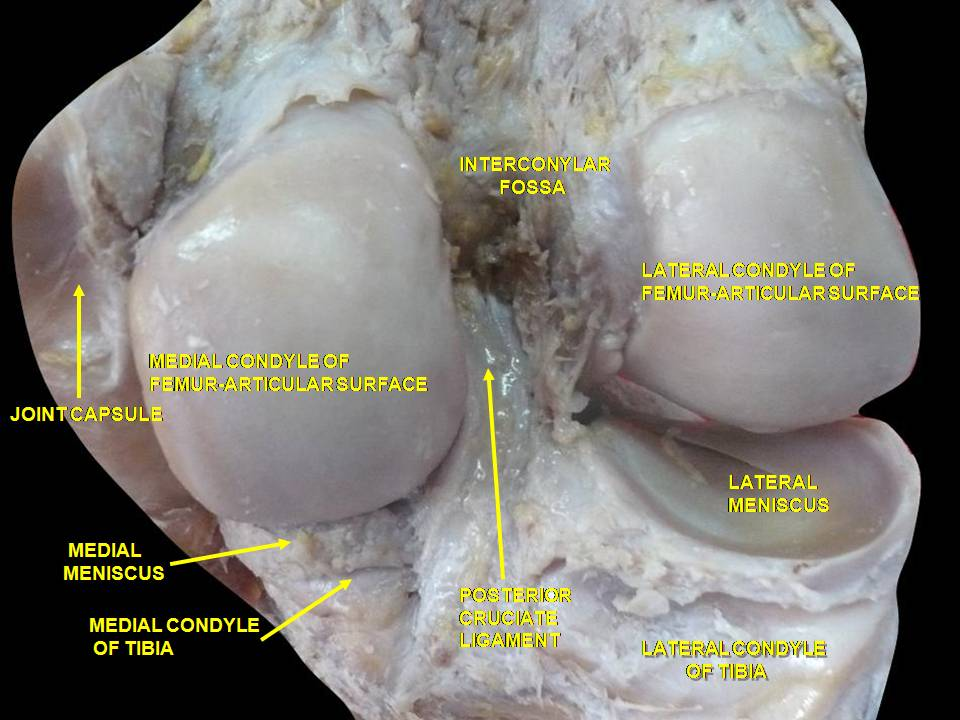
Right knee in extension. Deep dissection. Posterior view.

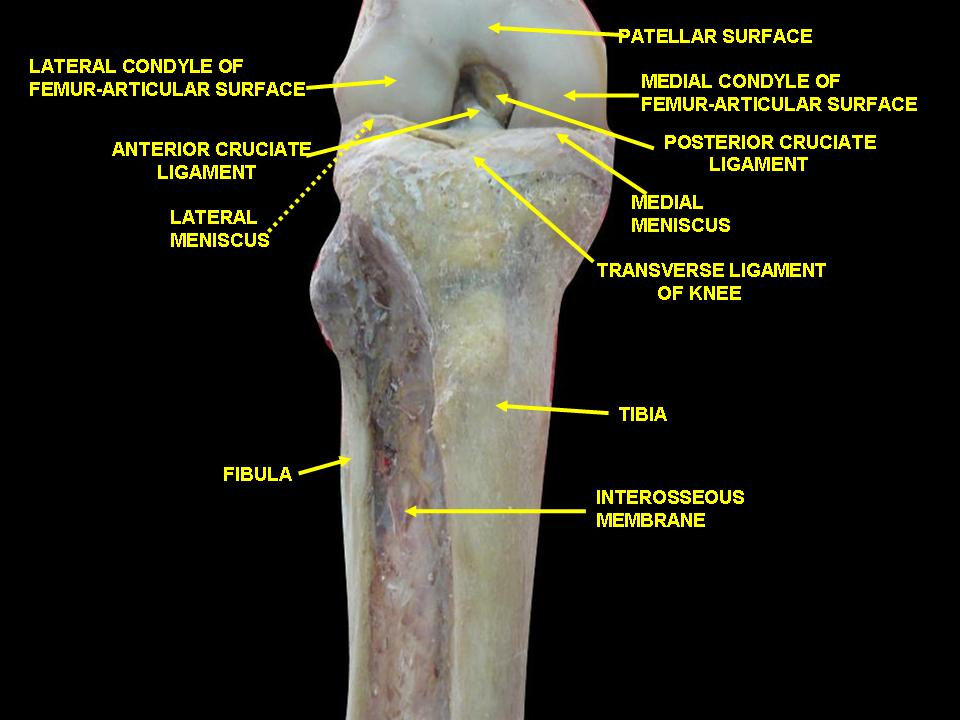
Knee and tibiofibular joint. Deep dissection. Anterior view.

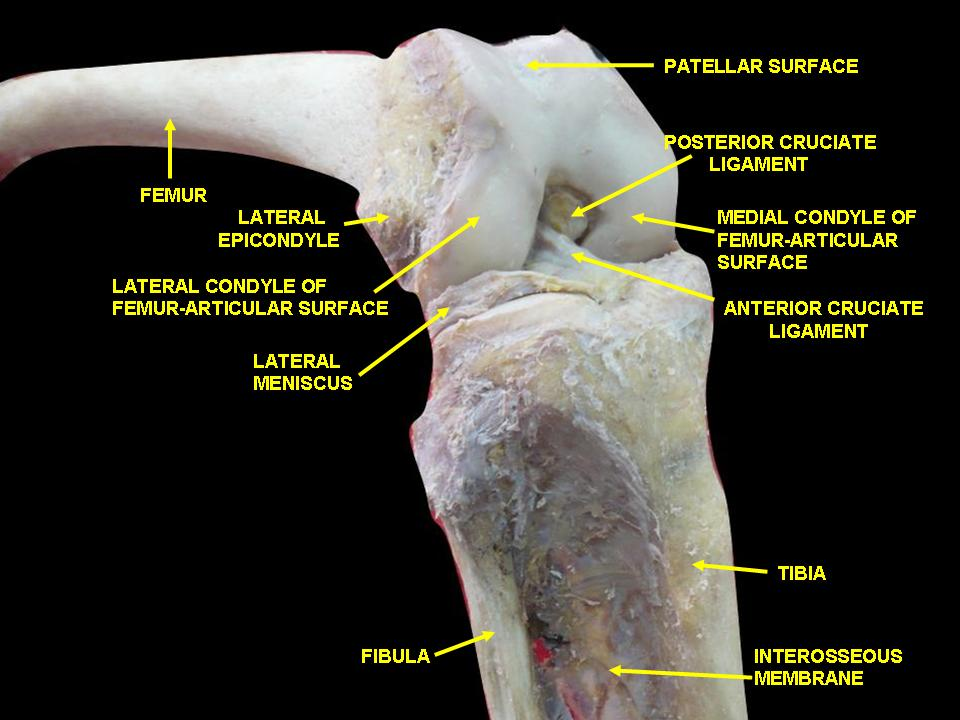
Knee and tibiofibular joint. Deep dissection. Anterior view.

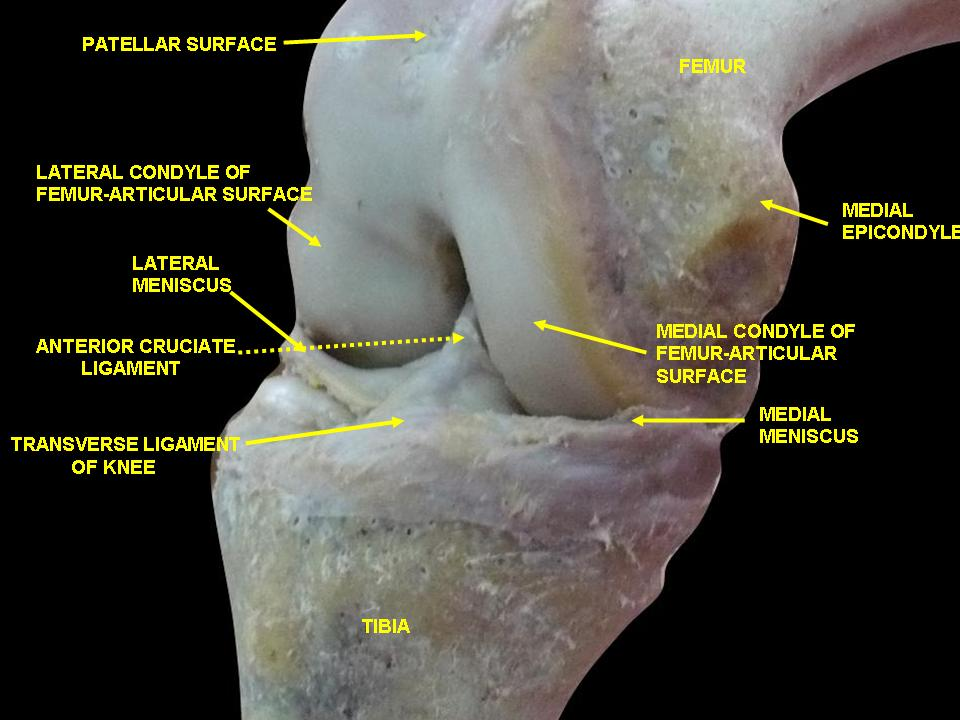
Knee joint. Deep dissection. Anteromedial view.

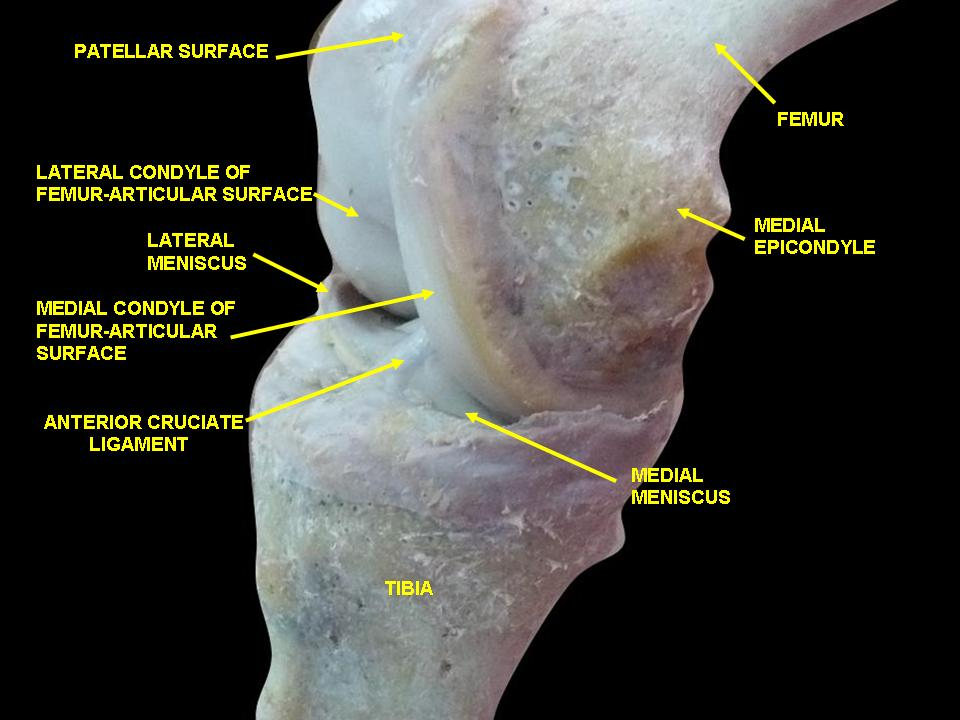
Knee joint. Deep dissection. Anteromedial view.

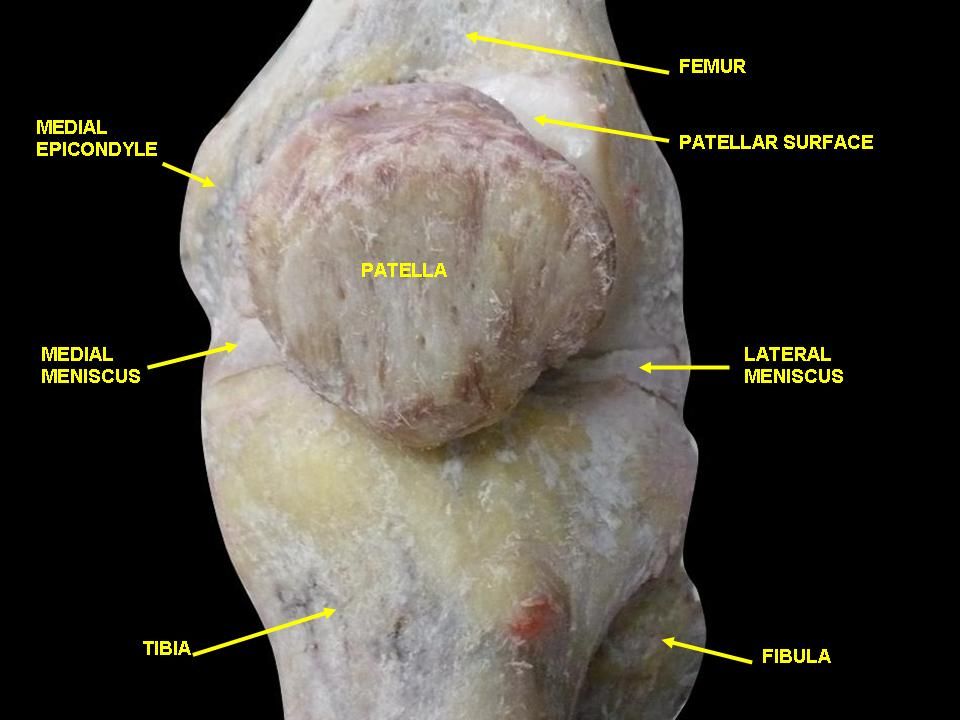
Knee joint. Deep dissection. Anteromedial view.

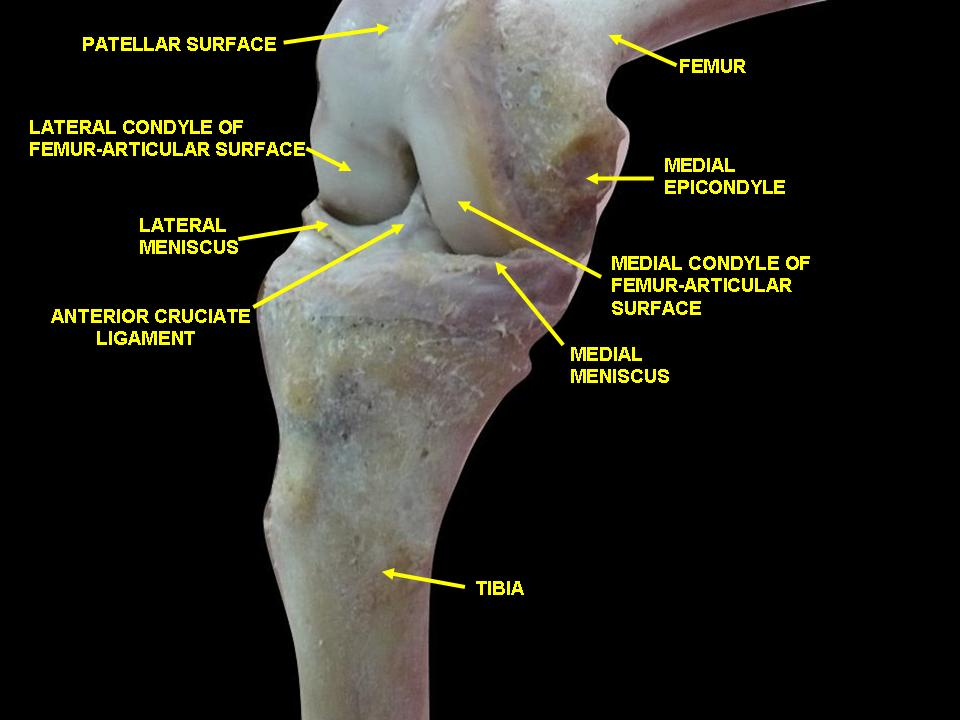
Knee joint. Deep dissection. Anteromedial view.

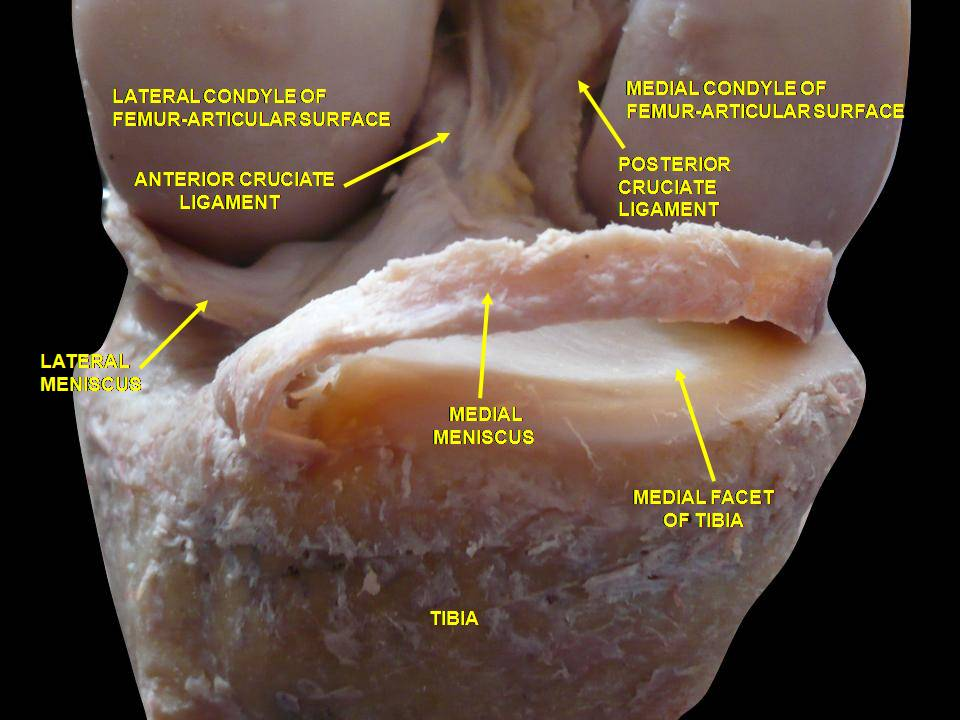
Knee joint. Deep dissection. Anterior view

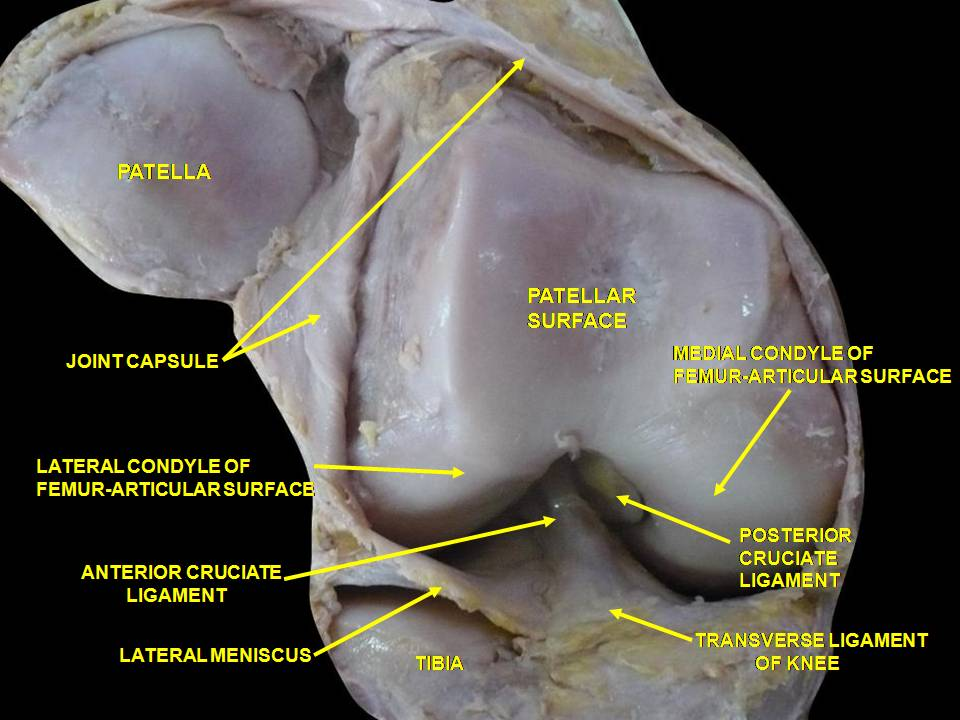
Knee joint. Deep dissection. Anterior view.

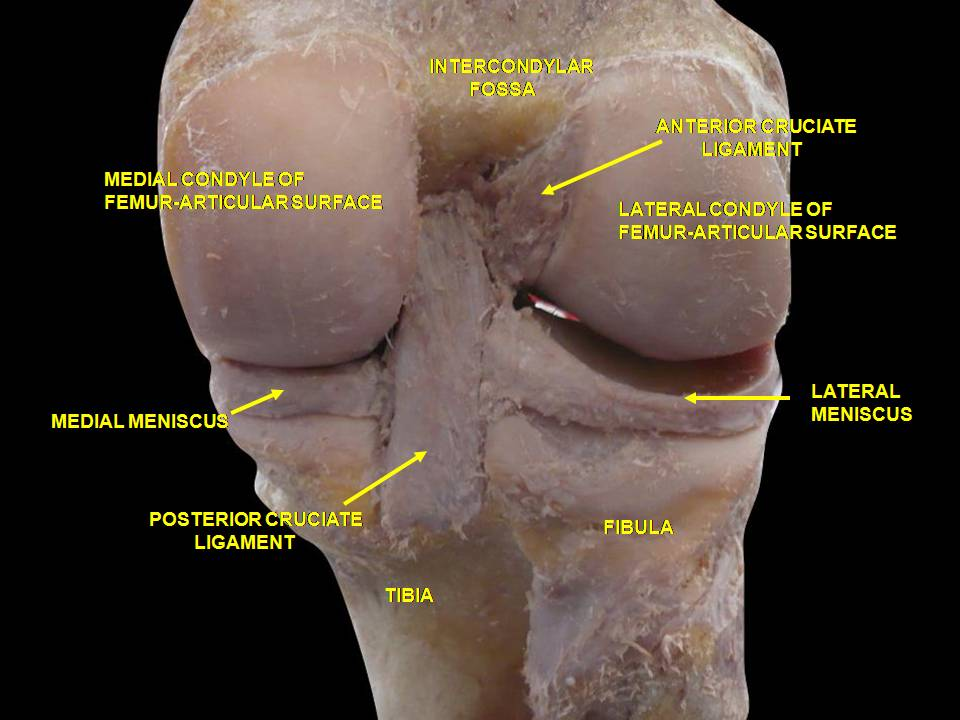
Knee joint. Deep dissection. Posterior view.

== See also ==
- Discoid meniscus
- Meniscal cartilage replacement therapy
