= Crus fracture =

Traumatic or pathological injury to tibia

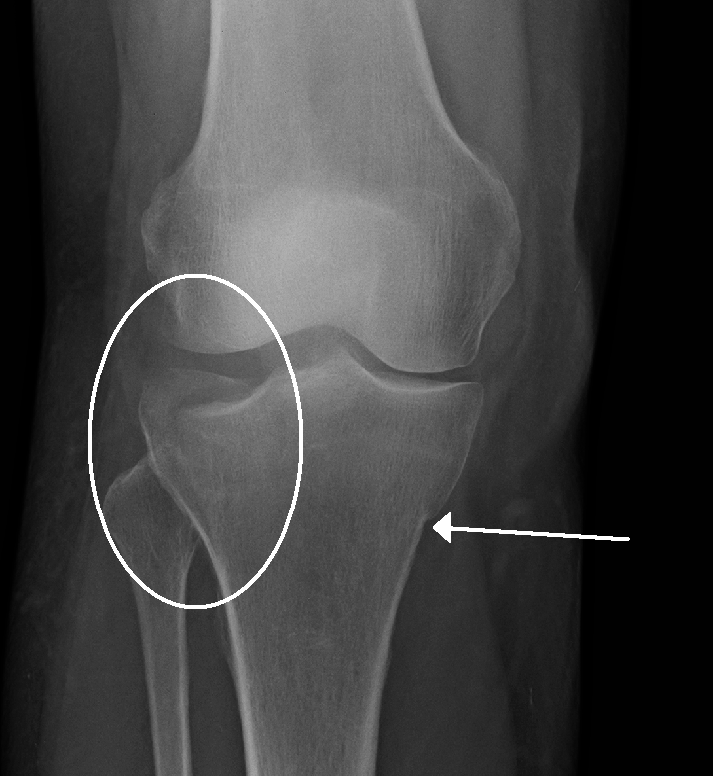
A tibial plateau fracture

A crus fracture is a fracture of the lower legs bones meaning either or both of the tibia and fibula.

A distal tibia fracture

== Tibia fractures ==
- Pilon fracture
- Tibial plateau fracture
- Tibia shaft fracture
- Bumper fracture - a fracture of the lateral tibial plateau caused by a forced valgus applied to the knee
- Segond fracture - an avulsion fracture of the lateral tibial condyle
- Gosselin fracture - a fractures of the tibial plafond into anterior and posterior fragments
- Toddler's fracture - an undisplaced and spiral fracture of the distal third to distal half of the tibia

== Fibular fracture ==
- Maisonneuve fracture - a spiral fracture of the proximal third of the fibula associated with a tear of the distal tibiofibular syndesmosis and the interosseous membrane.
- Le Fort fracture of ankle - a vertical fracture of the antero-medial part of the distal fibula with avulsion of the anterior tibiofibular ligament.
- Bosworth fracture - a fracture with an associated fixed posterior dislocation of the proximal fibular fragment which becomes trapped behind the posterior tibial tubercle. The injury is caused by severe external rotation of the ankle.
- Volkmann's fracture or Earle's fracture, a fracture of the postero-lateral rim of the distal fibula.

== Combined tibia and fibula fracture ==
A tib-fib fracture is a fracture of both the tibia and fibula of the same leg in the same incident. In 78% of cases, a fracture of the fibula is associated with a tibial fracture. Since the fibula is smaller and weaker than the tibia, a force strong enough to fracture the tibia often fractures the fibula as well. Types include:

- Trimalleolar fracture - involving the lateral malleolus, medial malleolus and the distal posterior aspect of the tibia
- Bimalleolar fracture - involving the lateral malleolus and the medial malleolus.
  - Pott's fracture - an archaic term loosely applied to a variety of bimalleolar ankle fractures.
