= Tibial plateau fracture =

- Other names: Fractures of the tibial plateau
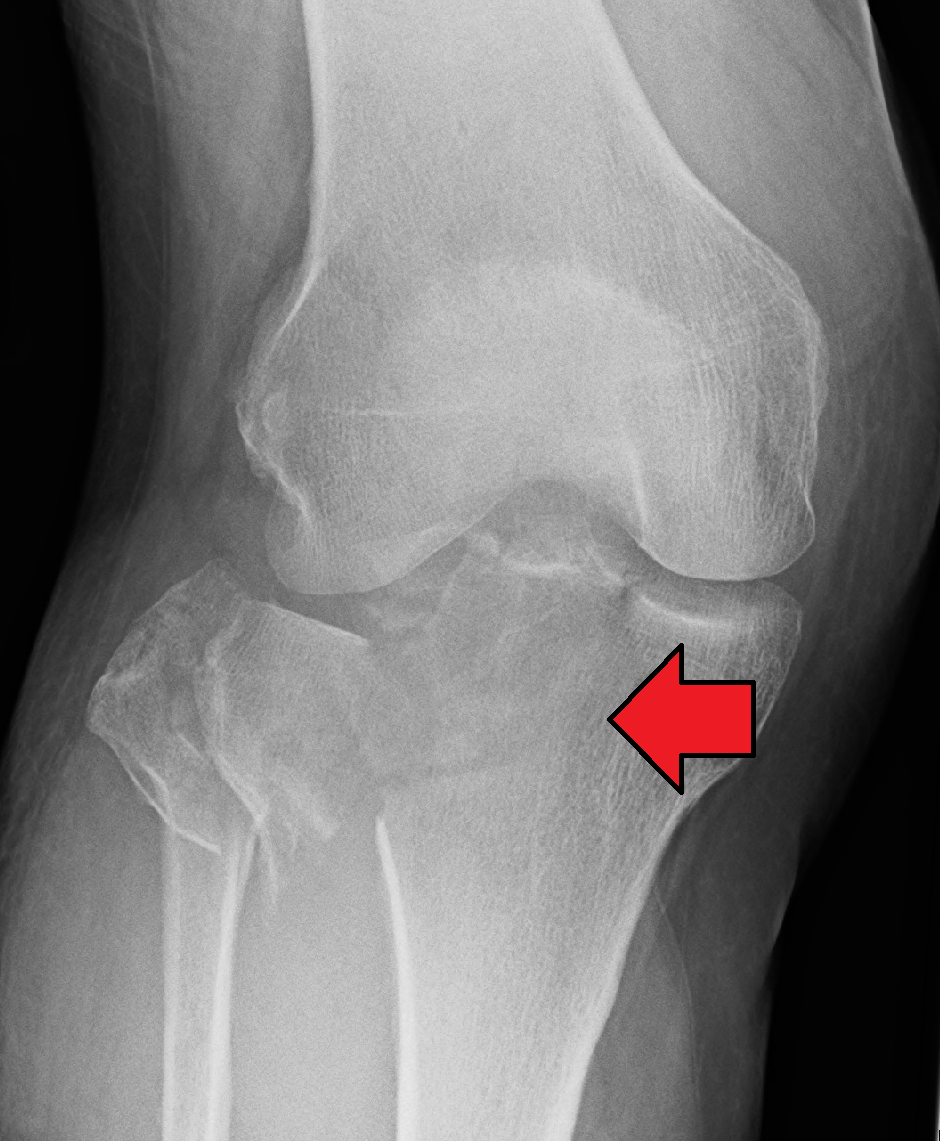
- A severe tibial plateau fracture with an associated fibular head fracture
- Specialty: Orthopedics
- Symptoms: Pain, swelling, decreased ability to move the knee
- Complications: Injury to the artery or nerve, compartment syndrome
- Types: Type I to Type VI
- Causes: Trauma (fall, motor vehicle collision)
- Risk factors: Osteoporosis, skiing
- Diagnostic method: Suspected based on symptoms, confirmed with X-rays and CT scan
- Differential diagnosis: Patella fracture, fibular fracture, anterior cruciate ligament injury
- Treatment: Surgery, splinting
- Medication: NSAIDs, opioids
- Prognosis: Arthritis is common
- Frequency: ~1% of fractures

A tibial plateau fracture is a break of the upper part of the tibia (shinbone) that involves the knee joint. This could involve the medial, lateral, central, or bicondylar (medial and lateral). Symptoms include pain, swelling, and a decreased ability to move the knee. People are generally unable to walk. Complication may include injury to the artery or nerve, arthritis, and compartment syndrome.

The cause is typically trauma such as a fall or motor vehicle collision. Risk factors include osteoporosis and certain sports such as skiing. Diagnosis is typically suspected based on symptoms and confirmed with X-rays and a CT scan. Some fractures may not be seen on plain X-rays.

Pain may be managed with NSAIDs, opioids, and splinting. In those who are otherwise healthy, treatment is generally by surgery. Occasionally, if the bones are well aligned and the ligaments of the knee are intact, people may be treated without surgery.

They represent about 1% of broken bones. They occur most commonly in middle aged males and older females. In the 1920s they were called a "bumper fracture" due to their association with people being hit by a motor vehicle while walking.

== Signs and symptoms ==
Tibial plateau fractures typically presents with knee effusion, swelling of the knee or fragmentation of the tibia which leads to loss of its normal structural appearance. Blood in the soft tissues and knee joint (hemarthrosis) may lead to bruising and a doughy feel of the knee joint. Due to the tibial plateau's proximity to important vascular (i.e. arteries, veins) and neurological (i.e. nerves such as peroneal and tibial) structures, injuries to these may occur upon fracture. A careful examination of the neurovascular systems is imperative. A serious complication of tibial plateau fractures is compartment syndrome in which swelling causes compression of the nerves and blood vessels inside the leg and may ultimately lead to necrosis or cell death of the leg tissues.

== Cause ==
Tibial plateau fractures may be divided into low energy or high energy fractures. Low energy fractures are commonly seen in older females due to osteoporotic bone changes and are typically depressed fractures. High energy fractures are commonly the result of motor vehicle accidents, falls or sports related injuries. These causes constitute the majority of tibial plateau fractures in young individuals.

== Mechanism ==
Fractures of the tibial plateau are caused by a varus (inwardly angulating) or valgus (outwardly angulating) force combined with axial loading or weight bearing on knee. The classically described situation in which this occurs is from a car striking a pedestrian's fixed knee (bumper fracture). A bumper fracture is usually a fracture of the lateral tibial plateau, caused by a forced valgus movement. This causes the lateral part of the distal femur and the lateral tibial plateau to come into contact, compressing the tibial plateau and causing the tibia to fracture. The name of the injury is because it was described as being caused by the impact of a car bumper on the lateral side of the knee while the foot is planted on the ground, although this mechanism is only seen in about 25% of tibial plateau fractures. The term "bumper fracture" was coined in 1929 by Cotton and Berg. Fracture of the neck of the fibula may also be found, and associated injury to the medial collateral ligament or cruciate ligaments occurs in about 10% of cases.

However, most of these fractures occur from motor vehicle accidents or falls. Injury can be due to a fall from height in which knee forced into valgus or varus. The tibial condyle is crushed or split by the opposing femoral condyle, which remains intact. The knee anatomy provides insight into predicting why certain fracture patterns occur more often than others. The medial plateau is larger and significantly stronger than the lateral plateau. Also, there is a natural valgus or outward angulation alignment to the limb which coupled with the often valgus or outwardly angulating force on impact will injure the lateral side. This explains how 60% of plateau fractures involve the lateral plateau, 15% medial plateau, 25% bicondylar lesions. Partial or complete ligamentous ruptures occur in 15-45%, meniscal lesions in about 5-37% of all tibial plateau fractures.

== Diagnosis ==
In all injuries to the tibial plateau radiographs (commonly called x-rays) are imperative. Computed tomography scans are not always necessary but are sometimes critical for evaluating degree of fracture and determining a treatment plan that would not be possible with plain radiographs. Magnetic Resonance images are the diagnostic modality of choice when meniscal, ligamentous and soft tissue injuries are suspected. CT angiography should be considered if there is alteration of the distal pulses or concern about arterial injury.

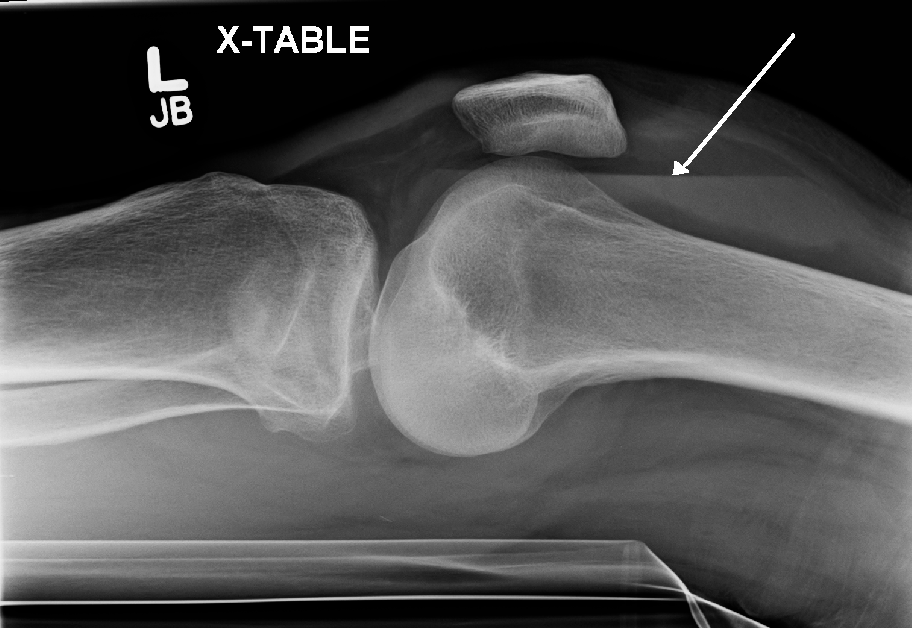
Lipohemarthrosis (presence of fat and blood from bone marrow in the joint space after an intraarticular fracture) seen on X-ray in a person with a subtle tibial plateau fracture

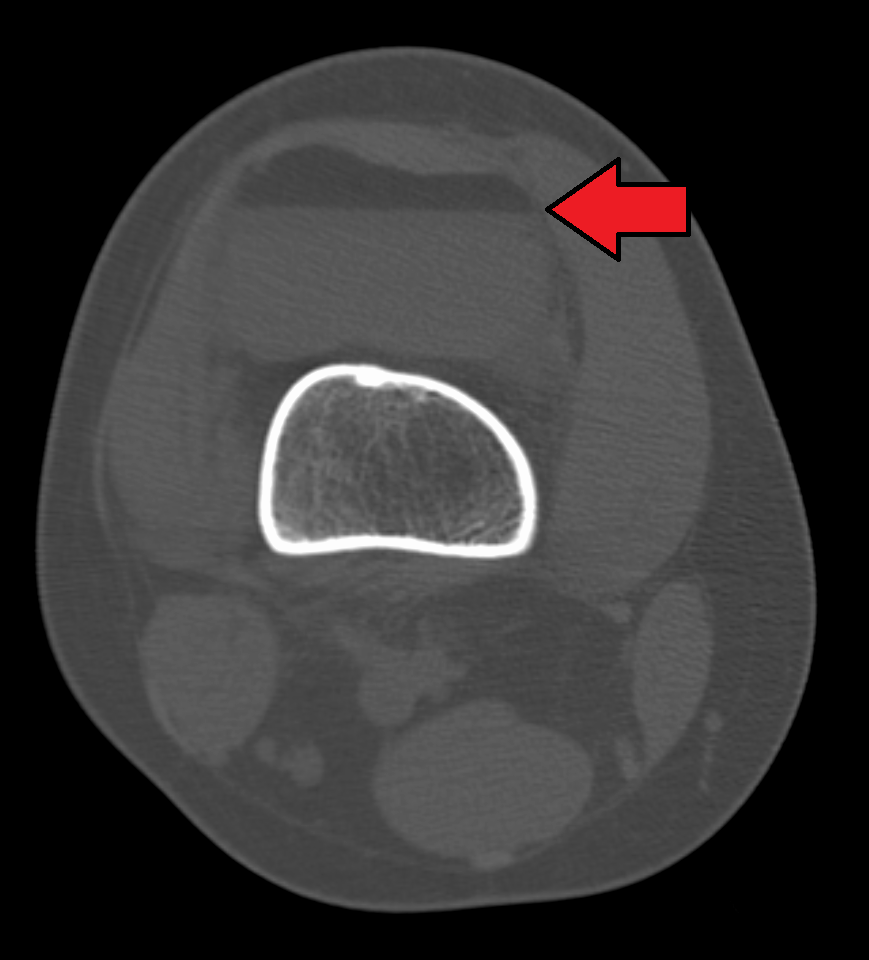
Lipohemarthrosis due to a tibial plateau fracture

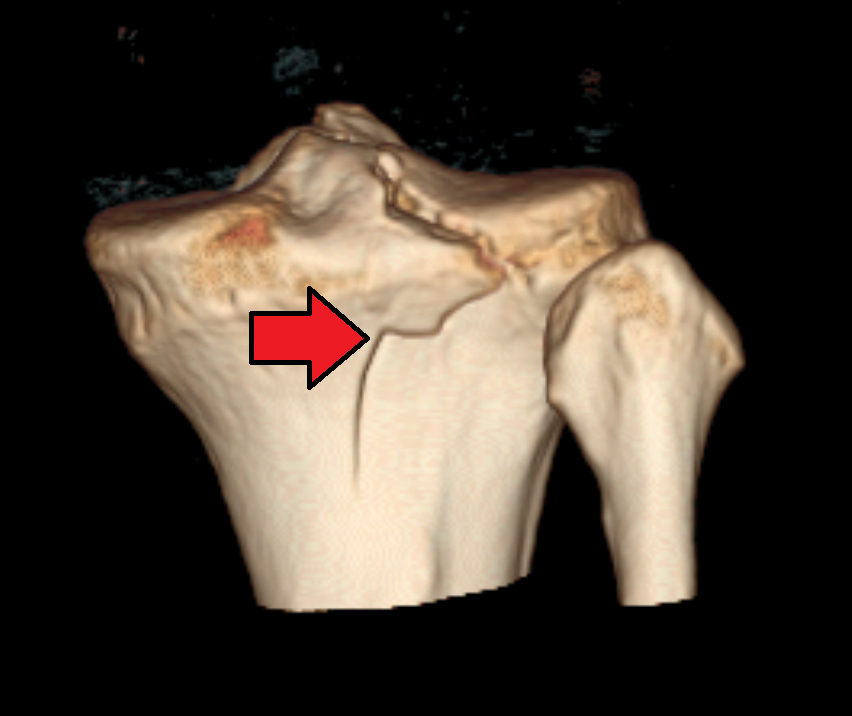
3D reconstruction of a CT image of a tibial plateau fracture

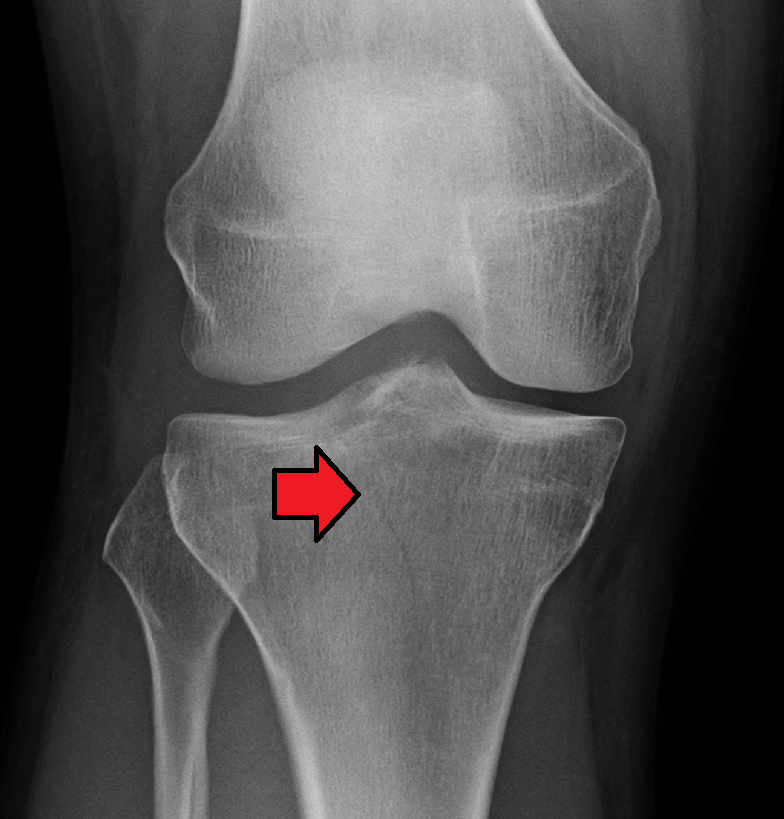
Subtle tibial plateau fracture on an AP X ray of the knee

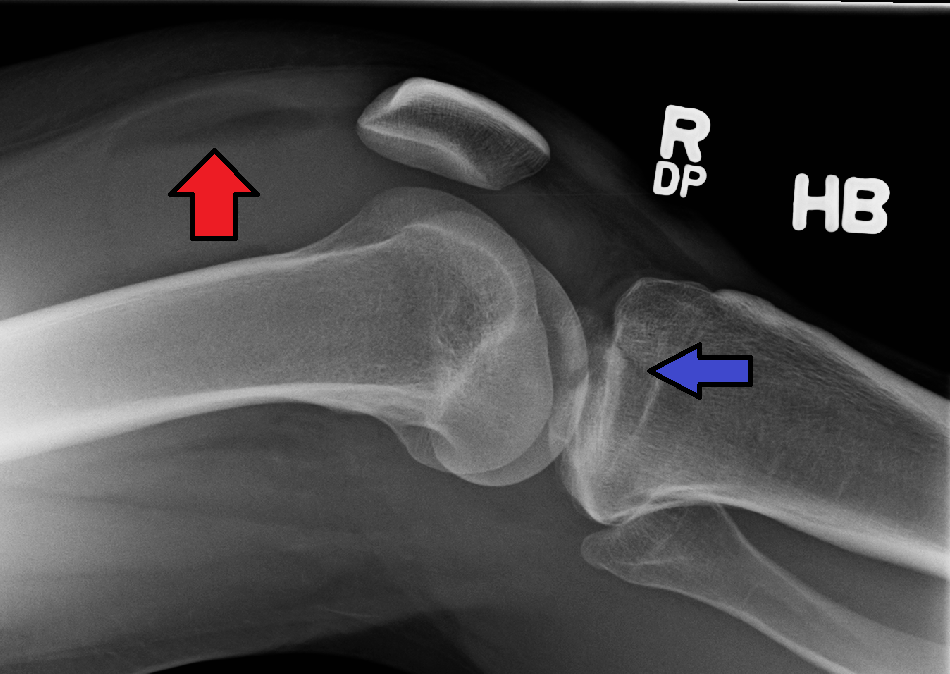
Lipohemarthrosis due to a tibial plateau fracture

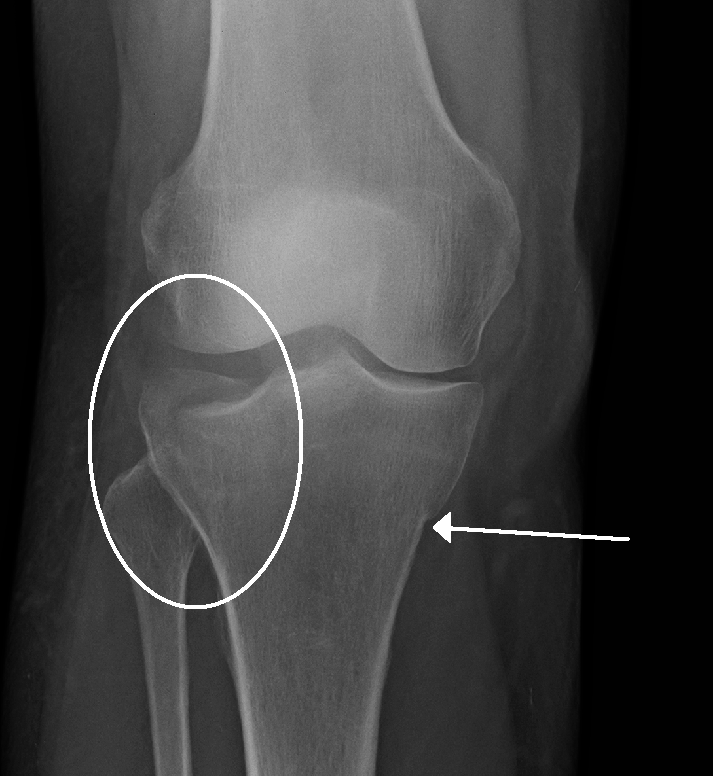
A tibial plateau fracture seen on X-ray

=== Classification ===
Physicians use classification types to assess the degree of injury, treatment plan and predict prognosis. Multiple classifications of tibial plateau fractures have been developed. Currently, the Schatzker classification system is the most widely accepted and used. It is composed of six condyle fracture types classified by fracture pattern and fragment anatomy. Each increasing numeric fracture type denotes increasing severity. The severity correlates with the amount of energy imparted to the bone at the time of injury and prognosis.

Schatzker classification for tibial plateau fracture:

- Type I = Lateral Tibial plateau fracture without depression.

This is a wedge-shaped pure cleavage fracture and involves a vertical split of the lateral tibial plateau. It is usually the result of a low energy injury in young individuals with normal mineralization. May be caused by a valgus force combined with axial loading that leads to the lateral femoral condyle being driven into the articular surface of the tibial plateau. Represent 6% of all tibial plateau fractures.

- Type II = Lateral tibial plateau fracture with depression,

This is a combined cleavage and compression fracture and involves vertical split of the lateral condyle combined with depression of the adjacent load bearing part of the condyle. Caused by a valgus force on the knee; it is a low energy injury, typically seen in individuals of the 4th decade or older with osteoporotic changes in bone. Most common, and make up 75% of all tibial plateau fractures. There is a 20% risk of distraction injuries to the medial collateral ligament. May include distraction injury to the medial collateral ligament or anterior cruciate ligament.

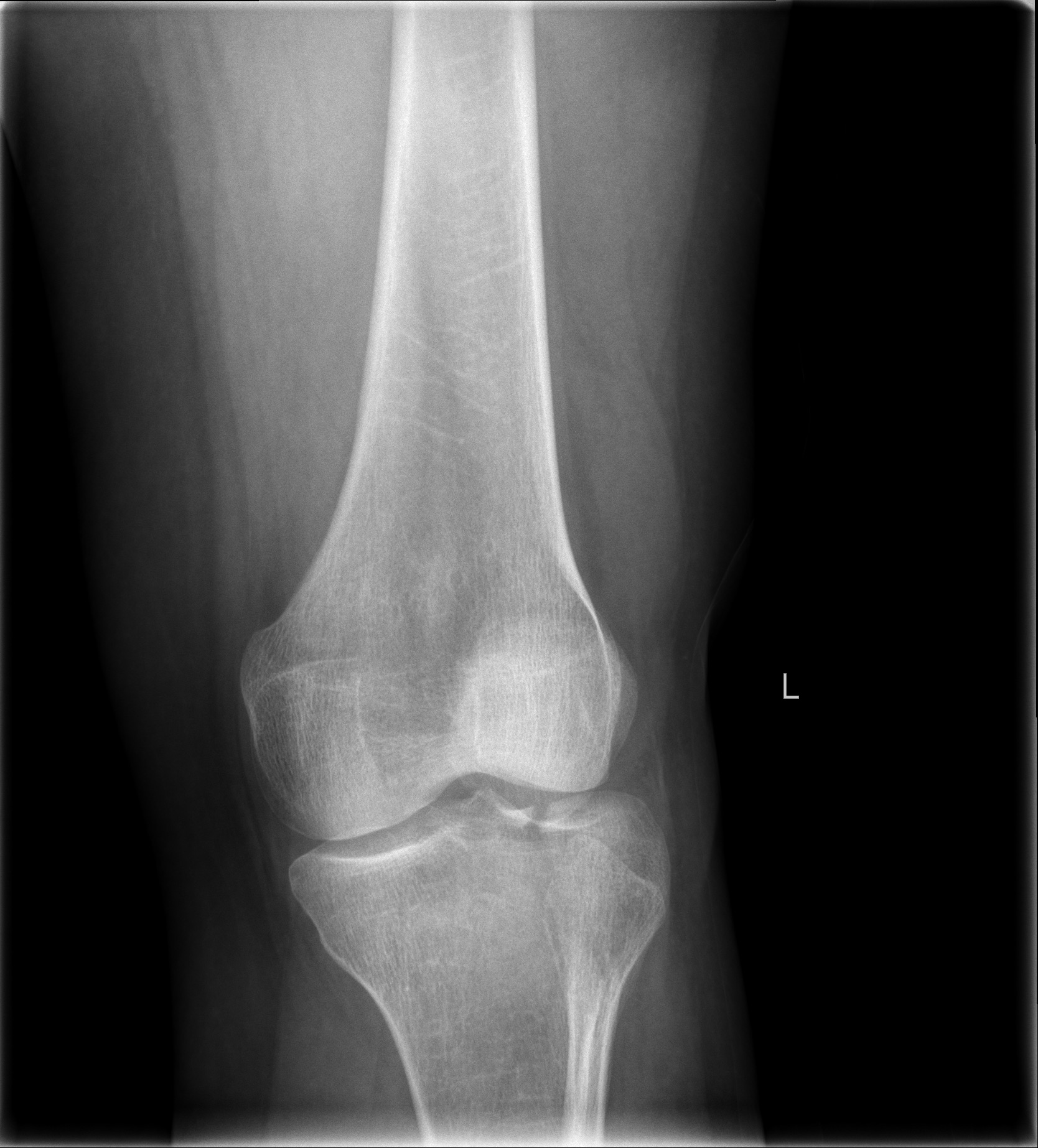
Lateral Tibial Plateau fracture XRay with Depression

- Type III: Focal depression of articular surface with no associated split.

This is a pure compression fracture of the lateral or central tibial plateau in which the articular surface of the tibial plateau is depressed and driven into the lateral tibial metaphysis by axial forces.3 A low energy injury, these fractures are more frequent in the 4th and 5th decades of life and individuals with osteoporotic changes in bone. They are extremely rare. Can be further divided into two subtypes: IIIA Compression Fracture of the lateral tibial plateau IIIB Compression Fracture of the central tibial plateau May result in joint instability.

- Type IV = Medial tibial plateau fracture, with or without depression; may involve tibial spines; associated soft tissue injuries.

This is a medial tibial plateau fracture with a split or depressed component. It is usually the result of a high energy injury and involves a varus force with axial loading at the knee. Represent 10% of all tibial plateau fractures. There is high risk of damage to the popliteal artery and peroneal nerve and therefore carry a worse prognosis. May include distraction injuries to lateral collateral ligament, fibular dislocation/fracture, posterolateral corner.

- Type V = Bicondylar tibial plateau fracture,

Consists of a split fracture of the medial and lateral tibial plateau. It is usually the result of a high energy injury with complex varus and valgus forces acting upon the tibial plateau. May include injuries to the anterior cruciate ligament and collateral ligaments. Make up 3% of all tibial plateau fractures.

- Type VI = Tibial plateau fracture with diaphyseal discontinuity

Main feature of this type of fracture is a transverse subcondylar fracture with dissociation of the metaphysis from the diaphysis. The fracture pattern of the condyles is variable and all types of fractures can occur. This is a high energy injury with a complex mechanism that includes varus and valgus forces. Up to 33% of these fractures may be open, often with extensive soft tissue injuries and risk of compartment syndrome. Represents 20% of all tibial plateau fractures.

Hohl and Moore is an alternative classification for tibial plateau fractures. The 5 types are:

- Type I: Split Fracture

This can be either the lateral or medial aspect of the plateau, this differs from Schatzker I which is a split fracture of the lateral plateau and Schatzker IV which is a split

- Type II: Entire Condylar Fracture

This can be either the entire medial or lateral condyle, differs from Schatzker V which involves both tibial condyles (medial and lateral)

- Type III: Rim Avulsion Fracture
- Type IV: Rim Depression Fracture
- Type V: Four-part fracture

== Treatment ==
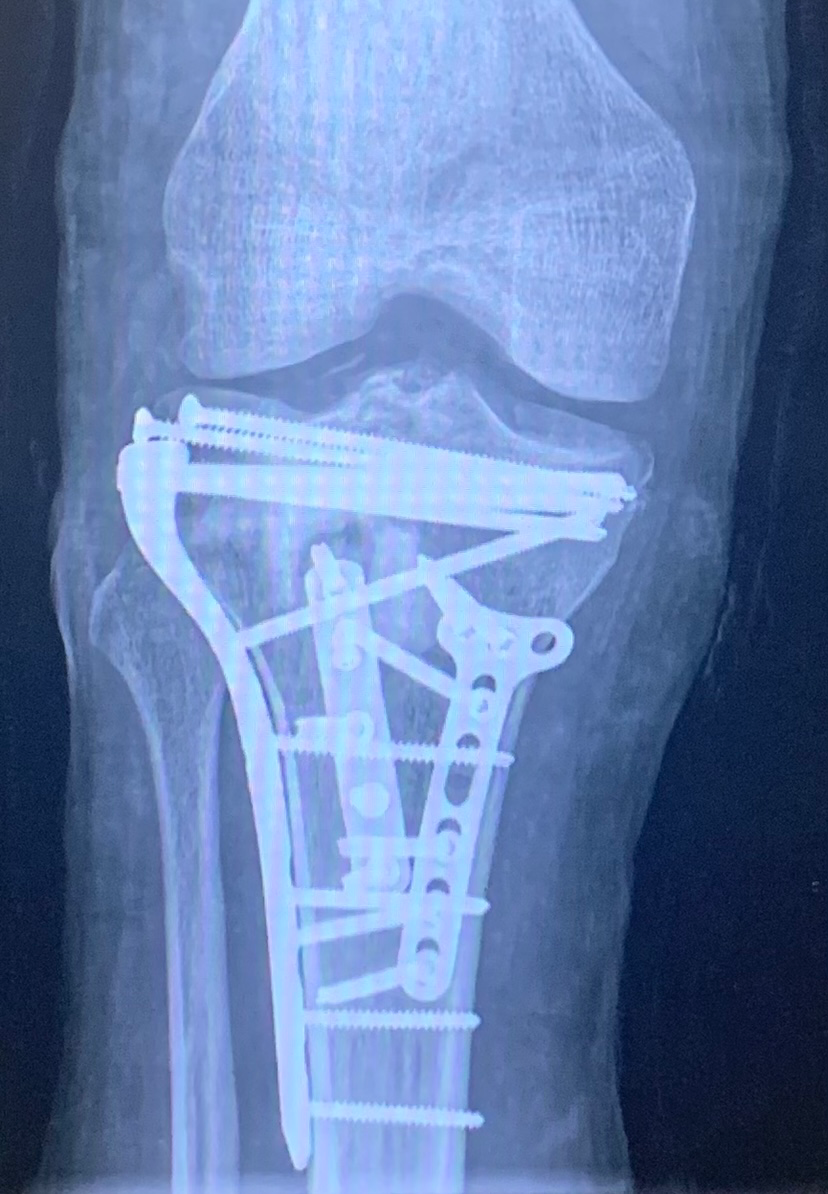
Repair of a tibial plateau fracture

Pain may be managed with NSAIDs, opioids, and splinting. In those who are otherwise healthy, treatment is generally by surgery. Occasionally, if the bones are well aligned and the ligaments of the knee are intact, people may be treated without surgery. The surgery usually involves reducing the fractured fragments of the tibia plateau to their anatomical position and fixing them in place with screws only or fixed angle anatomical plates ensuring absolute stability. Implant selection is based on the type of injury. Generally, simple or incomplete fractures (Schatzker type 1) of the plateau are compressed with 6.5mm partially threaded cancellous screws. Complex type fractures will require a plate for enhanced stability. As the tibia condyles articulate with the femur (thigh bone) to form knee joint, any incongruity in the articular surface is unacceptable as it leads to early arthritis, known as post-traumatic arthritis. The more displaced the joint intra-articular surface is, the more likely post-traumatic arthritis is to occur. Prolonged immobilization of the knee joint is also not recommended, which result in stiffness of the joint and difficult recovery. It's currently debated what role primary total knee arthroplasty (Joint Prosthesis) plays in the treatment of tibial plateau fractures. Although accompanied with risks small studies have shown promising results.

Surgery

A tibial plateau fracture requires orthopaedic surgical intervention for treatment. After X-ray and CT scans confirm fracture, Open Reduction Internal Fixation (ORIF) with medial and/or lateral plateau fixation is done. There are 5 different approaches that are most commonly used.

These are: anterolateral, posteromedial, posterolateral, posterior, and dual plate fixation.

- Anterolateral: anterior to ilio-tibial tract; proximal attachment of tibialis anterior muscle; avoid peroneal nerve around fibular head
- Posteromedial: interval between per anserinus and medial head of the gastrocnemius (calf muscle)
- Posterolateral: biceps femorus and peroneal nerve retracted laterally; lateral gastrocnemius and soleus retracted medially
- Posterior: done with the patient laying on stomach (prone); retract semimembranosus (one of hamstring muscles) until gastrocnemius becomes visible and continue until postero-medial capsule is visualized
- Dual plate fixation: can be used over medial and lateral aspects of plateau; used for bicondylar plateau fractures.

== Epidemiology ==
Tibial plateau fractures constitute 1% of all fractures. Peak age is 30–40 years old in men and 60–70 in women. Approximately half of the people who sustain a tibial plateau fracture are aged over 50 years old.
