= Varus deformity =

Deformity in which the bone near a joint is angled inward

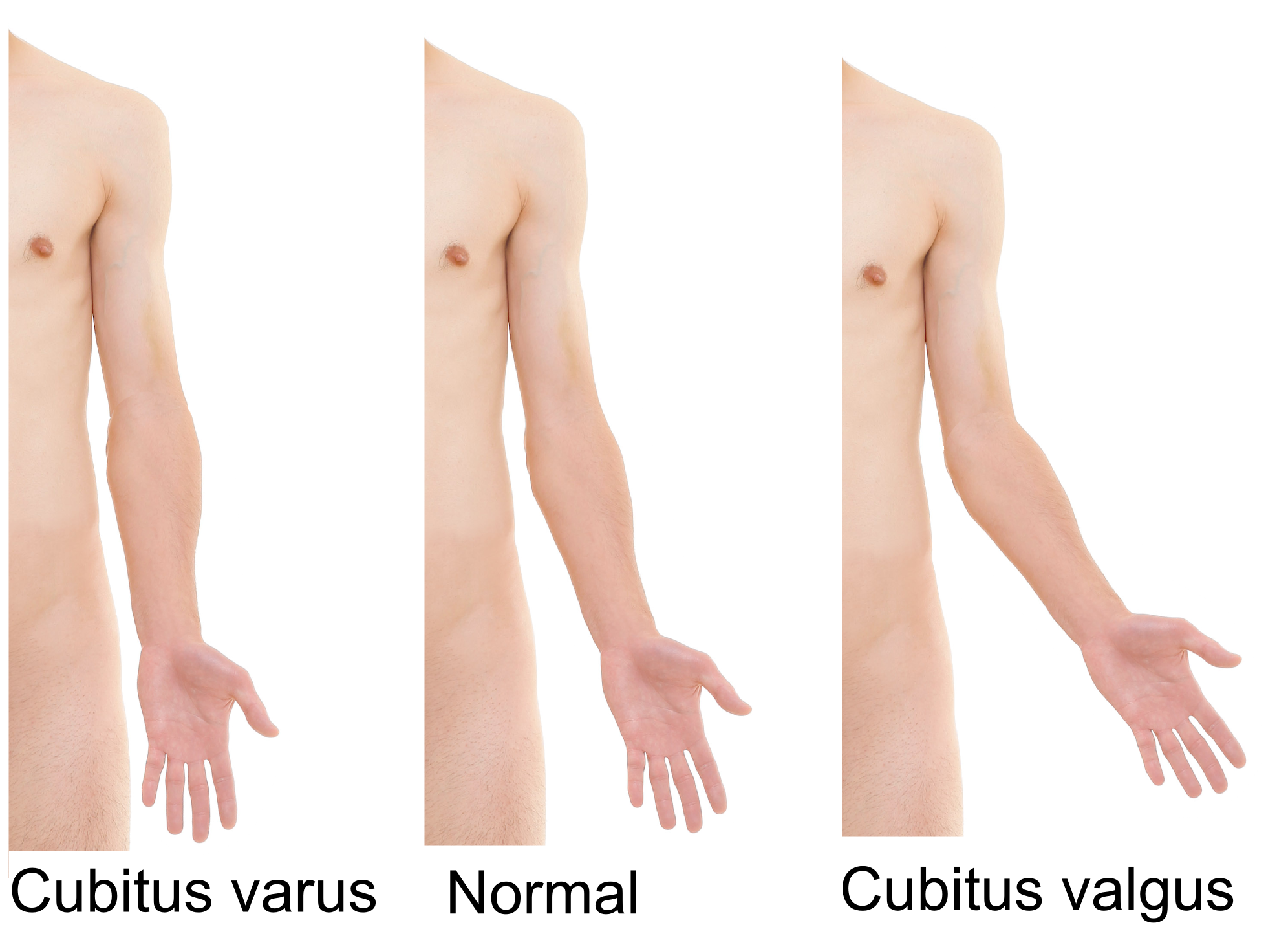
- Cubitus varus and cubitus valgus
- Specialty: Orthopedics

A varus deformity is an excessive inward angulation (medial, or towards the body's midline) of the distal segment of a bone or joint. The opposite of varus is called valgus.

The terms varus and valgus always refer to the direction that the distal segment of the joint points.

For example, a varus deformity at the knee results in a bowlegged posture with the distal part of the leg below the knee deviated inward in relation to the femur. Whereas in a valgus deformity of the knee, the distal part of the leg is deviated outward in relation to the femur, resulting in a knock-kneed posture.

== Evolution of usage ==
The terms varus and valgus are both Latin, but confusingly, their Latin meanings conflict with their current usage. A varus deformity of the knee now describes bowed legs, but in the original Latin, varus meant "knock-kneed." Similarly, while a valgus deformity of the knee now describes knocked knees, the original Latin meaning was "bow-legged." This is because adjectival application of these words to other body parts in medicine has changed their definitions, so that they now refer to the angle of the distal segment (e.g., valgus impaction in a Garden I femoral neck fracture). Strictly, therefore, knock-knee is both a varus deformity of the hip joint (coxa vara) and a valgus deformity of the knee joint (genu valgum), but it now called simply a valgus knee.

However, when said of a bone rather than a joint, the terms describe the bone's distal segment. Thus, a varus deformity of the tibia (e.g., a mid-shaft tibial fracture with varus deformity) refers to the distal segment in a varus alignment compared to the proximal segment.

== Examples ==
- Hip: coxa vara (Latin coxa = hip) — the angle between the head and the shaft of the femur is reduced, resulting in a limp.
- Knee: genu varum (Latin genu = knee) — the tibia is turned inward in relation to the femur, resulting in a bowleg.
- Ankle: talipes varus (from Latin talus = ankle and pes = foot). A notable subtype is clubfoot (talipes equinovarus), the inwards and downwards rotation of one or both feet.
- Toe: hallux varus (Latin hallux = big toe) — inward deviation of the big toe at the metatarsophalangeal joint.
- Elbows: cubitus varus (Latin cubitus = elbow) — elbow turned inward

== See also ==
- Valgus deformity
