= Genu varum =

Varus deformity

- Other names: Bow-leggedness
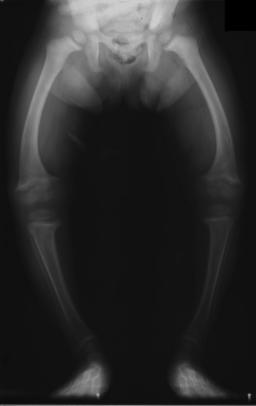
- X-Ray of the legs in a 2 year old child with rickets
- Specialty: Orthopædics

Genu varum (also called bow-leggedness, bandiness, bandy-leg, and tibia vara) is a varus deformity marked by (outward) bowing at the knee, which means that the lower leg is angled inward (medially) in relation to the thigh's axis, giving the limb overall the appearance of an archer's bow. Usually medial angulation of both lower limb bones (fibula and tibia) is involved.

== Causes ==
If a child is sickly, either with rickets or any other ailment that prevents ossification of the bones or is improperly fed, the bowed condition may persist. Thus the chief cause of this deformity is rickets. Skeletal problems, infection, and tumors can also affect the growth of the leg, sometimes giving rise to a one-sided bow-leggedness. The remaining causes are occupational, especially among jockeys, and from physical trauma, the condition being very likely to supervene after accidents involving the condyles of the femur.

=== Childhood ===
Children until the age of 3 to 4 have a degree of genu varum. The child sits with the soles of the feet facing one another; the tibia and femur are curved outwards; and, if the limbs are extended, although the ankles are in contact, there is a distinct space between the knee-joints. During the first year of life, a gradual change takes place. The knee-joints approach one another; the femur slopes downward and inward towards the knee joints; the tibias become straight, and the soles of the feet face almost directly downwards.

While these changes are occurring, the bones, which at first consist principally of cartilage, are gradually becoming ossified. By the time a normal child begins to walk, the lower limbs are prepared, both by their general direction and by the rigidity of the bones which form them, to support the weight of the body.

=== Rickets ===
Nutritional rickets is an important cause of childhood genu varum or bow legs in some parts of the world. Nutritional rickets is due to unhealthy life style habits as insufficient exposure to sun light which is the main source of vitamin D. Insufficient dietary intake of calcium is another contributing factor. Rickets may also have genetic causes, occasionally called resistant rickets. Rickets usually causes bone deformities in all four extremities. Rachitic activity secondary to nutritional (vitamin D deficiency) rickets may resolve spontaneously with modification of lifestyle activities or after receiving medical treatment. However, following resolution of rachitic activity or healing of active nutritional rickets, some residual genu varum deformities tend to self-correct over time while others tend to persist. Younger children with moderate deformities are more likely to remodel (self-correct) spontaneously over time. Contrastingly, genu varum deformities of healed nutritional rickets that do not correct spontaneously over approximately a one-year period are likely to need surgical intervention especially if they are severe and in older children and causing gait difficulties. The main surgical modality used to treat genu varum arising from rickets is guided growth surgery, also known as growth modulation surgery.

=== Blount's disease ===
Blount's disease is a deformity in the legs, mostly from the knees to the ankles. The affected bone curves in or out and forms the usual "archers bow" which can also be called bow-legs. There are two types of Blount's disease. The first type is Infantile: this means that children under four are diagnosed with this disease. Blount's disease in this age is very risky because sometimes it is not detected and it passes to the second type of Blount's disease. The second type of Blount's disease is found mostly in older children and in teenagers, sometimes in one leg and sometimes in both; the patient's age determines how severe the diagnosis is.

=== Osteochondrodysplasia ===
Osteochondrodysplasia are a diverse group of genetic bone diseases or genetic skeletal dysplasias that manifest in generalized bone deformities involving the extremities and the spine. Bow legs or genu varum is one of these deformities. The characteristic bone X-ray survey findings are important to confirm the diagnosis.

== Diagnosis ==
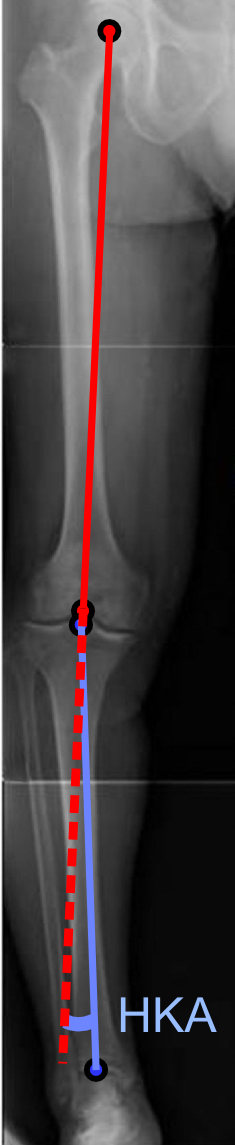
Hip-knee-ankle angle.

On projectional radiography, the degree of varus or valgus deformity can be quantified by the hip-knee-ankle angle, which is an angle between the femoral mechanical axis and the center of the ankle joint. It is normally between 1.0° and 1.5° of varus in adults. Normal ranges are different in children.

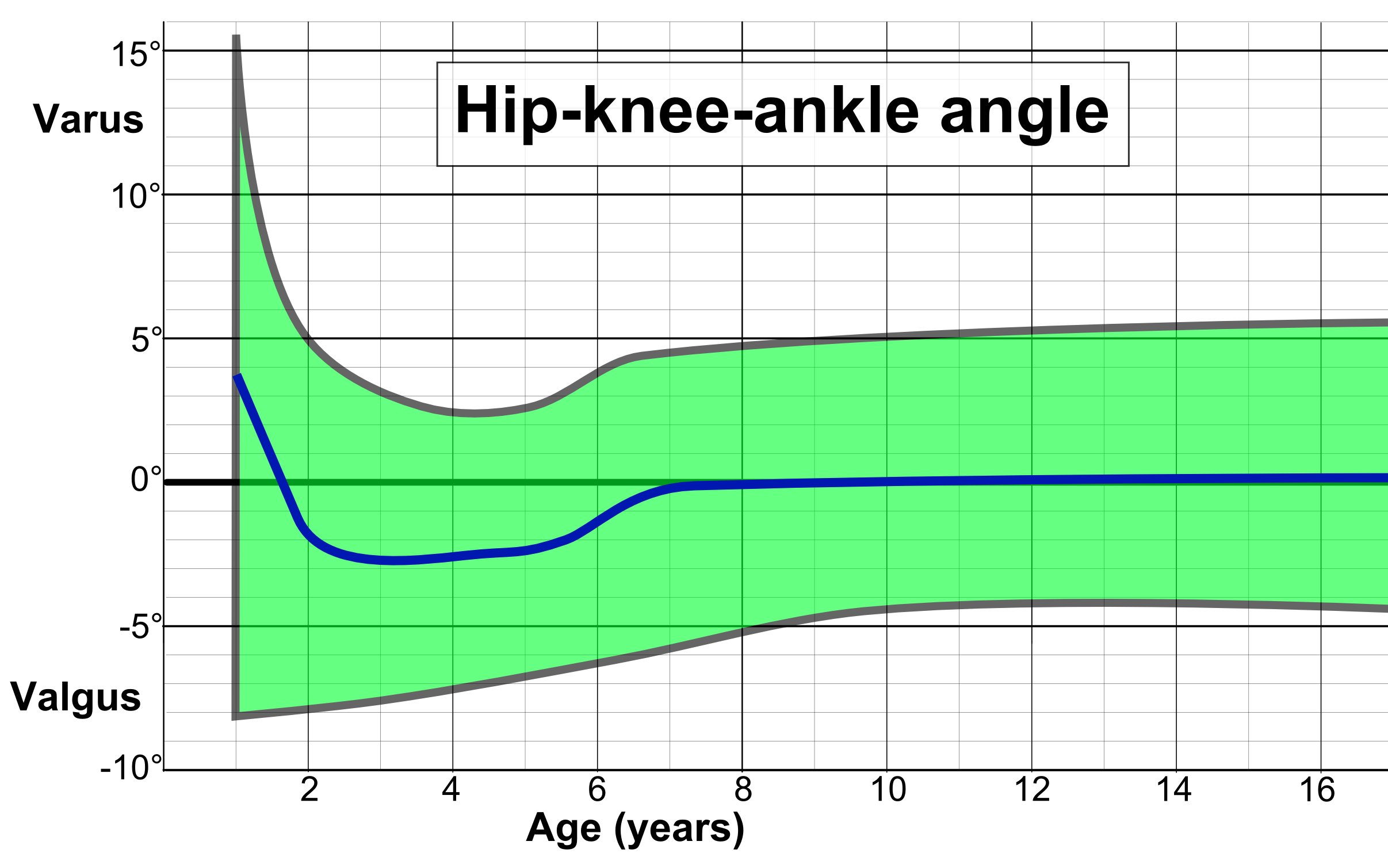
Hip-knee-ankle angle by age, with 95% prediction interval.

== Treatment ==
Valgus osteotomy. The black line is the mechanical axis. This process may be done to correct a varus deformity.

Generally, no treatment is required for idiopathic presentation as it is a normal anatomical variant in young children. Treatment is indicated when it persists beyond 3 1/2 years old. In the case of unilateral presentation or progressive worsening of the curvature, when caused by rickets, the most important thing is to treat the constitutional disease, at the same time instructing the care-giver never to place the child on their feet. In many cases, this is quite sufficient in itself to effect a cure, but matters can be hastened somewhat by applying splints. When the deformity arises in older patients, either from trauma or occupation, the only permanent treatment is surgery, but orthopaedic bracing can provide relief.

=== Rickets ===
Rickets usually causes bone deformities in all four extremities. Rachitic activity associated with nutritional rickets may resolve spontaneously with modification of life style activities or after receiving medical treatment. Following resolution of rachitic activity or healing of active nutritional rickets, some residual angular knee deformities tend to self-correct or remodel spontaneously over time. This alleviates the need for corrective surgical intervention. That is particularly applicable to young and middle-aged children with moderated deformities. Contrastingly, other patients with healed angular knee deformities including genu varum tend to persist. That is, they do not correct spontaneously and could require corrective surgery. The main surgical modality used to treat genu varum arising from rickets is guided growth surgery, also known as growth modulation surgery.

=== Blount's disease ===
Treatment for children with Blount's disease is typically braces but surgery may also be necessary. In children guided growth surgery is used to gradually correct/straighten the bow legs. For teenagers osteotomy or bone cutting is often used to correct the bone deformity. The operation consists of removing a piece of tibia, breaking the fibula and straightening out the bone; there is also a choice of elongating the legs. If not treated early enough, the condition worsens quickly.

=== Osteochondrodysplasia ===
Guided growth surgery in children is widely used to achieve gradual correction of knee deformities arising from osteochondrodysplasia including genu varum. Yet, this treatment is associated with a high incidence of recurrence and repeated surgeries may be needed to maintain proper bone alignment.

== Prognosis ==
In most cases persisting after childhood, there is little or no effect on the ability to walk. Due to uneven stress and wear on the knees, however, even milder manifestations can see an accelerated onset of arthritis.

== See also ==
- Genu valgum
- Genu recurvatum
- Knee pain
- Knee osteoarthritis
- Rickets
- Varus deformity
