= Bimalleolar fracture =

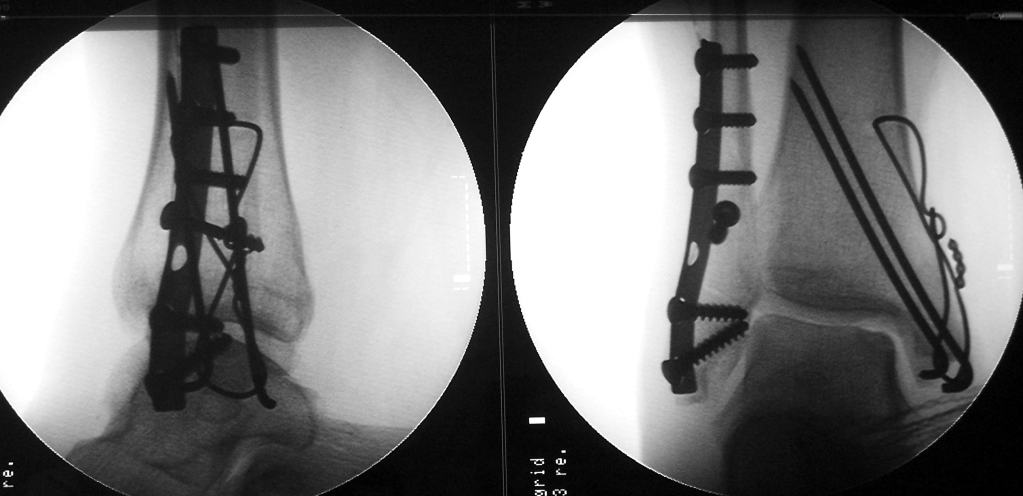
- Surgically treated bimalleolar fracture
- Specialty: Orthopedics

A bimalleolar fracture is a fracture of the ankle that involves the lateral malleolus and the medial malleolus. Studies have shown that bimalleolar fractures are more common in women, people over 60 years of age, and patients with existing comorbidities.

== Treatment ==
Surgical treatment will often be required, usually an Open Reduction Internal Fixation (ORIF). This involves the surgical reduction, or realignment, of the fracture followed by the implementation of surgical implants to aid in the healing of the fracture.

== Prognosis ==
According to some studies, patients with bimalleolar fractures had significantly worse function in the ankle one year after surgical treatment. After recovering fully from their fractures, the majority of patients experience little to mild pain and have few restrictions in functionality.

== See also ==
- Trimalleolar fracture
- Pott's fracture
