= Pott's fracture =

Archaic term for ankle fractures

Pott's fracture, also known as Pott's syndrome I and Dupuytren fracture, is an archaic term loosely applied to a variety of bimalleolar ankle fractures. The injury is caused by a combined abduction external rotation from an eversion force. This action strains the sturdy medial (deltoid) ligament of the ankle, often tearing off the medial malleolus due to its strong attachment. The talus then moves laterally, shearing off the lateral malleolus or, more commonly, breaking the fibula superior to the tibiofibular syndesmosis. If the tibia is carried anteriorly, the posterior margin of the distal end of the tibia is also sheared off by the talus. A fractured fibula in addition to detaching the medial malleolus will tear the tibiofibular syndesmosis. The combined fracture of the medial malleolus, lateral malleolus, and the posterior margin of the distal end of the tibia is known as a "trimalleolar fracture".

An example of Pott's fracture would be in a sports tackling injury. The player receives a blow to the outside of the ankle, causing the ankle to roll inwards (so that the sole of the foot faces laterally). This damages the ligaments on the inside of the ankle and fractures the fibula at the point of contact (usually just above the tibiofibular syndesmosis). A better way to visualize this is the two hands of a clock, with one hand facing 12 and the other facing 6. The vertical line they form represents the fibula of the person's right leg. The lateral force approaches from 3 o'clock, sending the lower hand snapping outwards to point at 5 o'clock.

Bimalleolar fractures are less likely to result in arthritis than trimalleolar fractures.

== History ==
English physician Percivall Pott experienced this injury in 1765 and described his clinical findings in a paper published in 1769.

The term "Dupuytren fracture" refers to the same mechanism, and it is named for Guillaume Dupuytren. Pott did not describe disruption of the tibio-fibular ligament, whereas Dupuytren did.
