= Ella Harper =

Folk figure and circus performer (1870–1921)

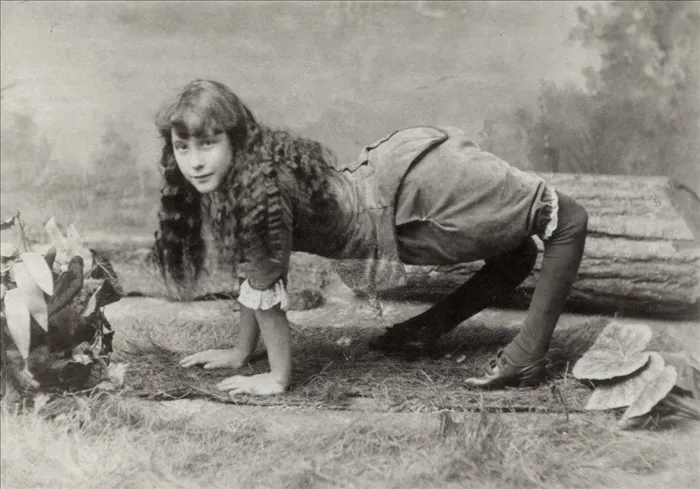
- Harper in 1886
- Born: Ella Harper; 5 January 1870; Sumner County, Tennessee
- Died: 19 December 1921 (aged 51); Nashville, Tennessee
- Resting place: Spring Hill Cemetery; 36°14′13.8″N 86°43′26″W
- Occupation: Circus performer
- Years active: 1882–1886
- Spouse: Robert L. Savely (1905)
- Parent(s): William Harper and Minerva Childress

Ella Harper (January 5, 1870 – December 19, 1921), known professionally as The Camel Girl, was born with an extremely rare orthopedic condition that caused her knees to bend backwards, called congenital genu recurvatum.

Harper was born with congenital genu recurvatum, a rare orthopedic condition present at birth in which the knees bend backward instead of forward. The condition made it difficult for her to walk upright. Instead, she found it easier to move on her hands and feet, a distinctive gait that led circus promoters to advertise her as "The Camel Girl". In 1886 she was featured as the star in W. H. Harris's Nickel Plate Circus, appearing in newspapers wherever the circus visited. The back of her pitch card reads:

I am called the camel girl because my knees turn backward. I can walk best on my hands and feet as you see me in the picture. I have traveled considerably in the show business for the past four years and now, this is 1886 and I intend to quit the show business and go to school and fit myself for another occupation.

Harper received a $200 per week salary for her appearances (equivalent to $7,200 in 2025). The money she earned via this role likely afforded her opportunities in life she may not otherwise have had.

Harper married a schoolteacher named Robert Savely in 1905. She died in 1921 at the age of fifty-one due to colon cancer. She is buried in Spring Hill Cemetery in Nashville, Tennessee.
