= St. Helena familial genu valgum =

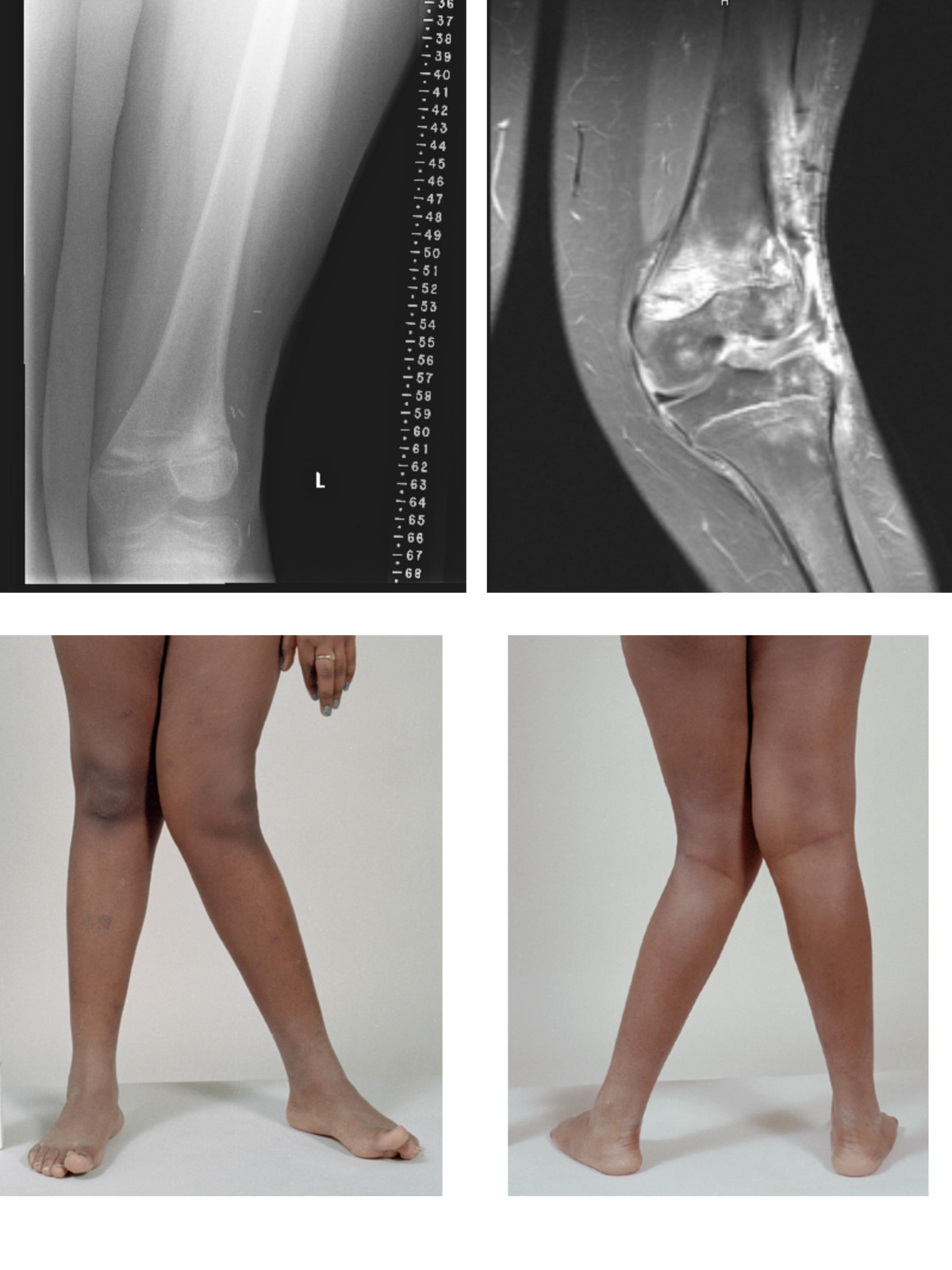
- This disorder is characterized by severe post-pubertal genu valgum.
- Specialty: Medical genetics
- Prevention: none
- Prognosis: Medium
- Frequency: very rare, only 2 families worldwide have been described in medical literature with the disorder
- Deaths: -

St. Helena familial genu valgum is a very rare genetic disorder which is characterized by post-puberty genu valgum and misalignment at the elbows and wrists of variable severity. It is inherited in an autosomal dominant manner. It has been described in 2 families from St. Helena and Iran.

== History ==
This disorder was first discovered in October 1986 by Beighton et al., when they described a 3-generation consanguineous family from St. Helena where various of its members (5 sibships) were affected with severe genu valgum.

Ghorbani et al. made a second case report of this disorder in April 1994; they described 5 affected members from a 2-generation family from Galaz, an isolated village located in Northwestern Iran. Two of the children had been born from the father's first marriage and three of the children were born from the father's second marriage. None of his 2 sons under the age of 11 or six daughters from both marriages showed any abnormalities. Suggesting this disorder to be autosomal dominant with sex-limited expression. The affected members only had post-pubertal severe asymmetrical genu valgum.
