= Cubitus valgus =

Deformity involving outward deviation of an extended forearm

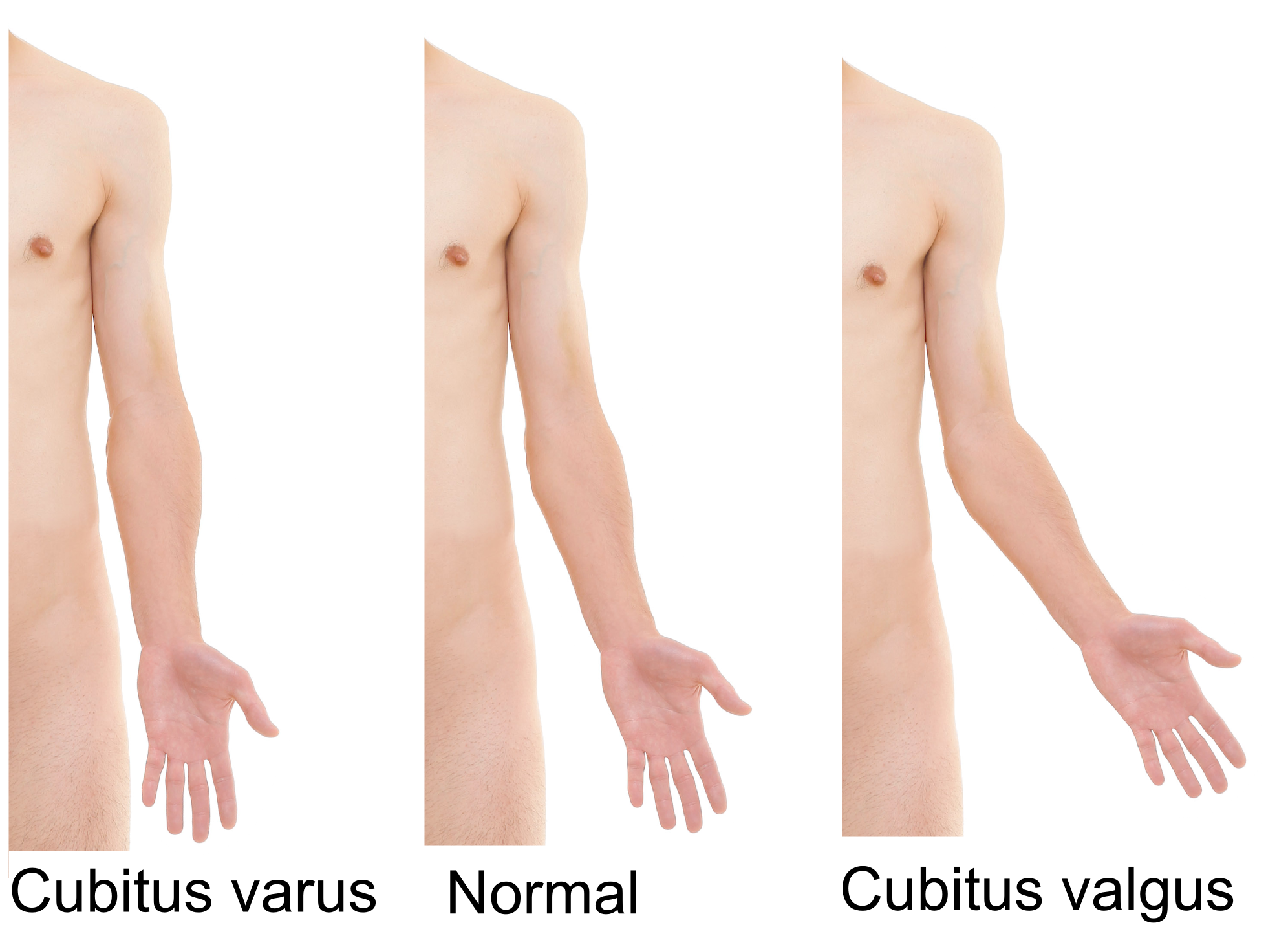
- Cubitus varus versus cubitus valgus
- Specialty: Medical genetics

Cubitus valgus is a medical deformity in which the forearm is angled away from the body to a greater degree than normal when fully extended. A small degree of cubitus valgus (known as the carrying angle) is acceptable and occurs in the general population.

When present at birth, it can be an indication of Turner syndrome or Noonan syndrome. It can also be acquired through fracture or other trauma. The physiological cubitus valgus varies from 3° to 29°. Women usually have a more pronounced cubitus valgus than men. The deformity can also occur as a complication of fracture of the lateral condyle of the humerus, which may lead to tardy/delayed ulnar nerve palsy. The opposite condition is cubitus varus (736.02).

== See also ==
- Valgus deformity
- Varus deformity
