= Spring Hill Cemetery (Nashville, Tennessee) =

Cemetery in Davidson County, Tennessee

Coordinates: 36°14′19″N 86°43′13″W

Spring Hill Funeral Home & Cemetery is a funeral home and cemetery in Nashville, Tennessee located at 5110 Gallatin Pike South in the neighborhood of Madison. It holds over 40,000 graves.

Prior to the establishment of the cemetery, the Davidson Academy (a precursor to the University of Nashville) was located in a stone house at this location.

In addition to two British Royal Air Force veterans of World War II, circus performer Ella Harper, US Congressman Richard Merrill Atkinson, animator Suzan Pitt, and MLB player Red Lucas, the cemetery is the final resting place for numerous notable music performers including the following:

- Roy Acuff: singer, songwriter, music publisher
- Tommy Brown: baseball player
- Peter Cooper: music journalist, songwriter, and musician
- Floyd Cramer: piano legend
- Pete Drake: steel guitar player
- Howard "Howdy" Forrester: fiddle player
- John Hartford: singer, fiddler
- Bobby Hebb: soul singer, songwriter, musician, recording artist, performer
- Jan Howard: singer and songwriter
- Jimmy Martin: bluegrass singer
- George Morgan: singer
- Speck Rhodes: country music comedian and entertainer
- Jeannie Seely: singer and songwriter
- Earl Scruggs: bluegrass musician
- Hank Snow: singer
- Billy Marvin Walker: singer
- Kitty Wells: singer
- Keith Whitley: singer
- Beth Slater Whitson: songwriter
- Johnnie Wright: singer and songwriter
