= Genu recurvatum =

Orthopedic deformity

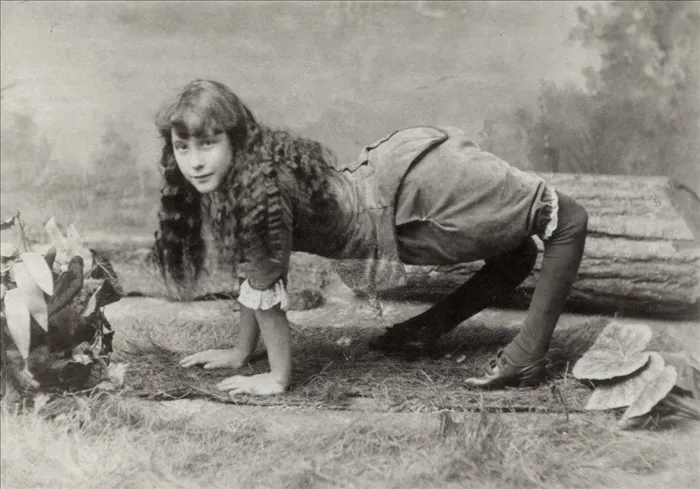
- Ella Harper, a sideshow performer, had genu recurvatum and was billed as "The Camel Girl."
- Specialty: Medical genetics, rheumatology

Genu recurvatum is a deformity in the knee joint, so that the knee bends backwards. In this deformity, excessive extension occurs in the tibiofemoral joint. Genu recurvatum is also called knee hyperextension and back knee. This deformity is more common in women and is correlated with men with extremely high testosterone and people with familial ligamentous laxity. Hyperextension of the knee may be mild, moderate or severe.

The normal range of motion (ROM) of the knee joint is from 0 to 135 degrees in an adult. Full knee extension should be no more than 10 degrees. In genu recurvatum, normal extension is increased.

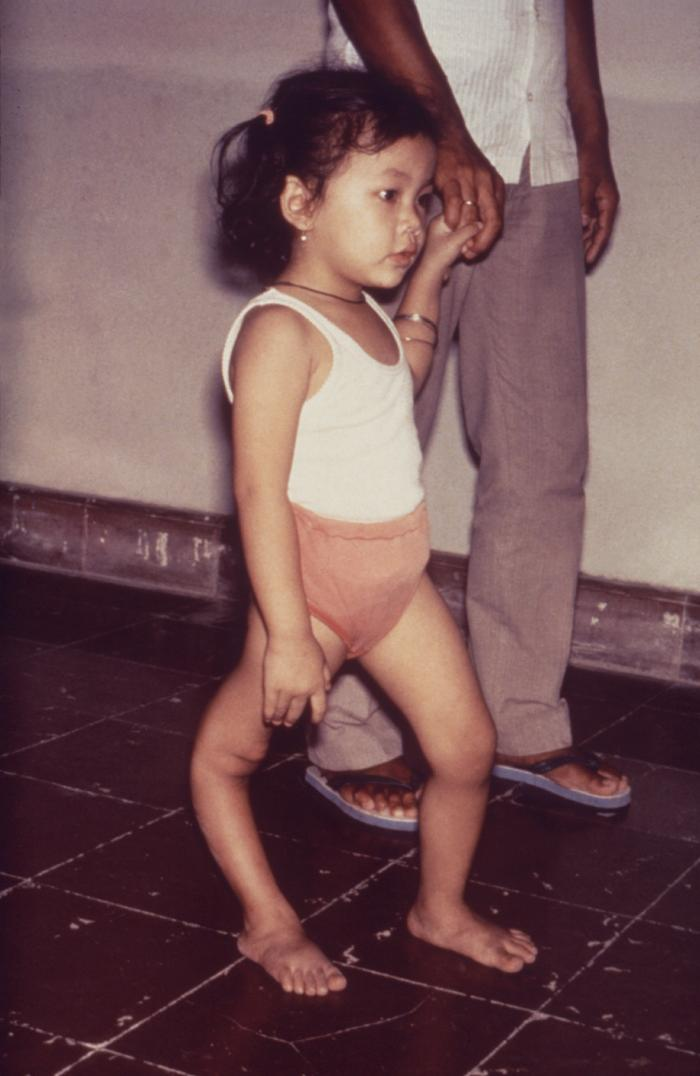
A girl with genu recurvatum of her right leg due to polio

The following factors may be involved in causing this deformity:

- Inherent laxity of the knee ligaments
- Weakness of biceps femoris muscle
- Instability of the knee joint due to ligaments and joint capsule injuries
- Inappropriate alignment of the tibia and femur
- Malunion of the bones around the knee
- Weakness in the hip extensor muscles
- Gastrocnemius muscle weakness (in standing position)
- Upper motor neuron lesion (for example, hemiplegia as the result of a cerebrovascular accident)
- Lower motor neuron lesion (for example, in post-polio syndrome)
- Deficit in joint proprioception
- Lower limb length discrepancy
- Congenital genu recurvatum
- Cerebral palsy
- Muscular dystrophy
- Limited dorsiflexion (plantar flexion contracture)
- Popliteus muscle weakness
- Connective tissue disorders. In these disorders, there are excessive joint mobility (joint hypermobility) problems. These disorders include:
  - Marfan syndrome
  - Loeys–Dietz syndrome
  - Ehlers–Danlos syndrome
  - Benign hypermobile joint syndrome
  - Osteogenesis imperfecta disease

== Pathophysiology ==
The most important factors of knee stability include:

- Ligaments of the knee: The knee joint is stabilized by four main ligaments:
  - Anterior cruciate ligament (ACL). The ACL has an important role in stabilization of knee extension movement by preventing the knee from hyperextending.
  - Posterior cruciate ligament (PCL)
  - Medial collateral ligament (MCL)
  - Lateral collateral ligament (LCL)
- Joint capsule or articular capsule (especially posterior knee capsule)
- Quadriceps femoris muscle
- Appropriate alignment of the femur and tibia (especially in knee extension position )

== Treatment ==
Treatment generally includes the following:

- Sometimes pharmacologic therapy for initial disease treatment
- Physical therapy: physiotherapy will be beneficial in patient with complaint of pain, discomfort.
- Occupational therapy
- Use of appropriate assistive devices such as orthoses
- Surgery

== Incidence ==
This condition is considered to be rare, with about 1 in 100,000 births being affected by the congenital form of genu recurvatum, although it is a common feature in some disorders, such as in joint hypermobility, which affects 1 in 30 people.

== See also ==
- Genu valgum
- Genu varum
- Hypermobility
