= Valgus deformity =

Deformity in which the bone near a joint is angled outward

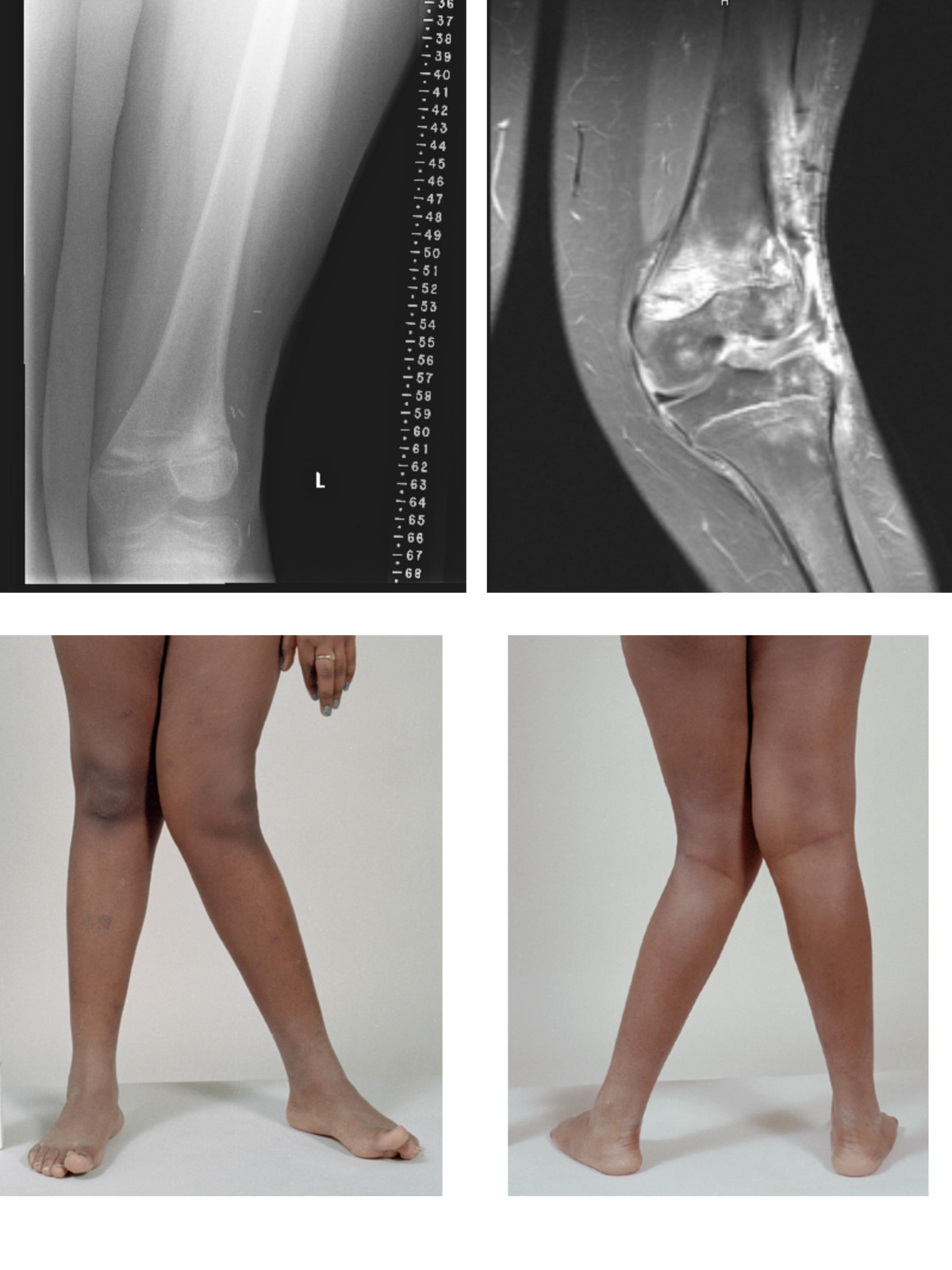
- Valgus deformity of the knee (genu valgum), seen in MRI and photograph
- Specialty: Orthopedics

A valgus deformity is a condition in which the bone segment distal to a joint is angled outward, that is, angled laterally, away from the body's midline. The opposite deformation, where the twist or angulation is directed medially, toward the center of the body, is called varus.

== Knee arthritis with valgus knee ==
Rheumatoid knee commonly presents as valgus knee. Osteoarthritis knee may also sometimes present with valgus deformity though varus deformity is common. Total knee arthroplasty (TKA) to correct valgus deformity is surgically difficult and requires specialized implants called constrained condylar knees.

== Examples ==
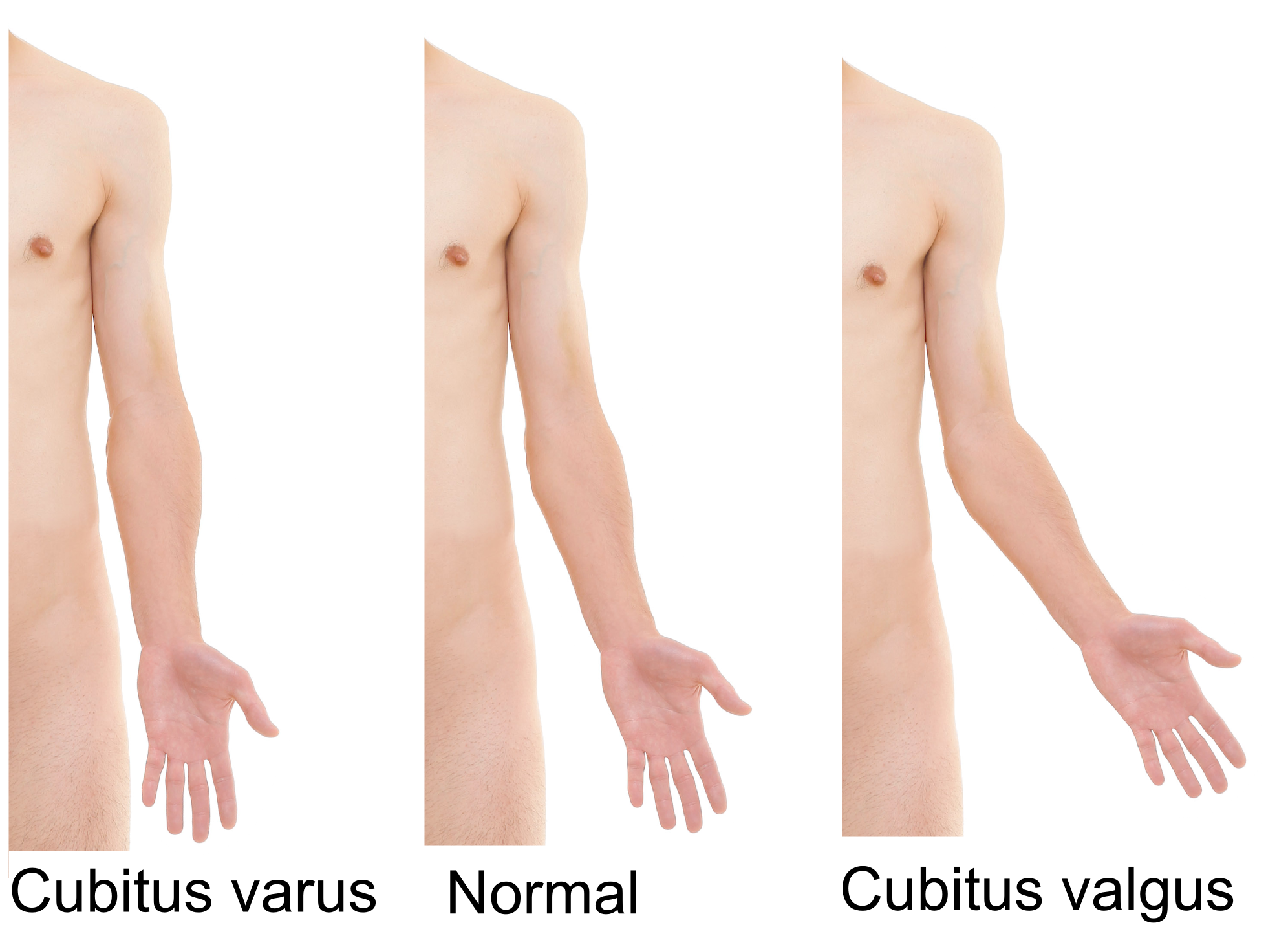
Cubitus varus and cubitus valgus

- Ankle: talipes valgus (from Latin talus = ankle and pes = foot) – outward turning of the heel, resulting in a 'flat foot' presentation.
- Elbows: cubitus valgus (from Latin cubitus = elbow) – forearm is angled away from the body.
- Foot: pes valgus (from Latin pes = foot) – a medial deviation of the foot at subtalar joint.
- Hand: manus valgus (from Latin manus = hand)
- Hip: coxa valga (from Latin coxa = hip) – the shaft of the femur is bent outward in respect to the neck of the femur. Coxa valga >125 degrees. Coxa vara <125 degrees.
- Knee: genu valgum (from Latin genu = knee) – the tibia is turned outward in relation to the femur, resulting in a "knock-kneed" appearance. Common causes of knock-knee in adults include arthritis of the knee and traumatic injuries.
- Toe: hallux valgus (from Latin hallux = big toe) – outward deviation of the big toe toward the second toe, resulting in bunion.
- Wrist: Madelung's deformity – deformity wherein the wrist bones are not formed properly due to a genetic disorder.

== Terminology ==
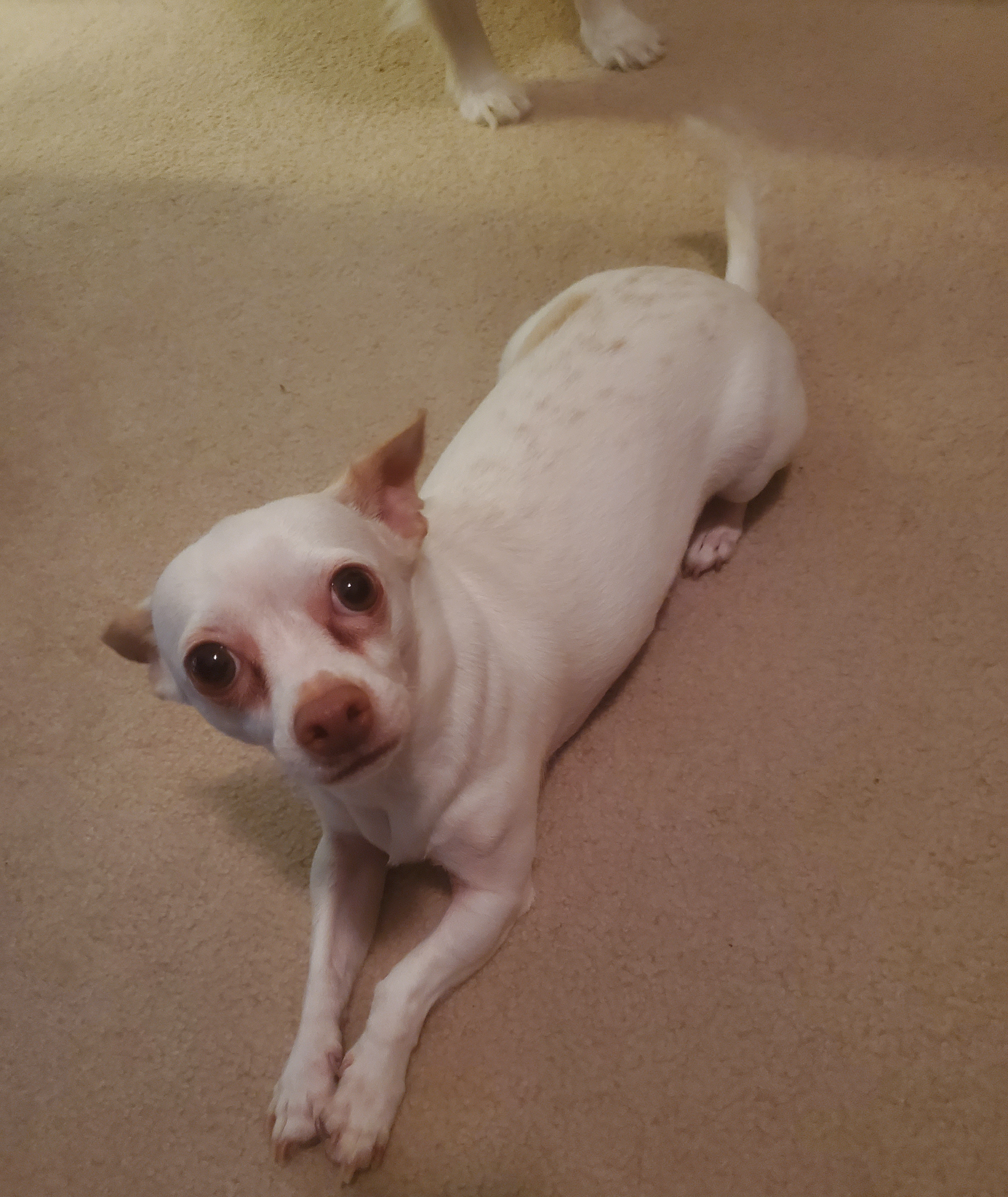
A chihuahua with a valgus deformity in the left forelimb

Valgus is a term for outward angulation of the distal segment of a bone or joint. The opposite condition is called varus, which is a medial deviation of the distal bone. The terms "varus" and "valgus" always refer to the direction in which the distal segment of the joint points. The original Latin definitions for varus and valgus were the opposite of their current usage. For a discussion of the etymology of these words, see the entry under varus. A mnemonic to remember the two deformities is that valgus contains an "L", for Lateral deviation.

== See also ==
- Varus deformity
