= Genu valgum =

Abnormal inward turning of the knees when straightening the legs

- Other names: Knock knee
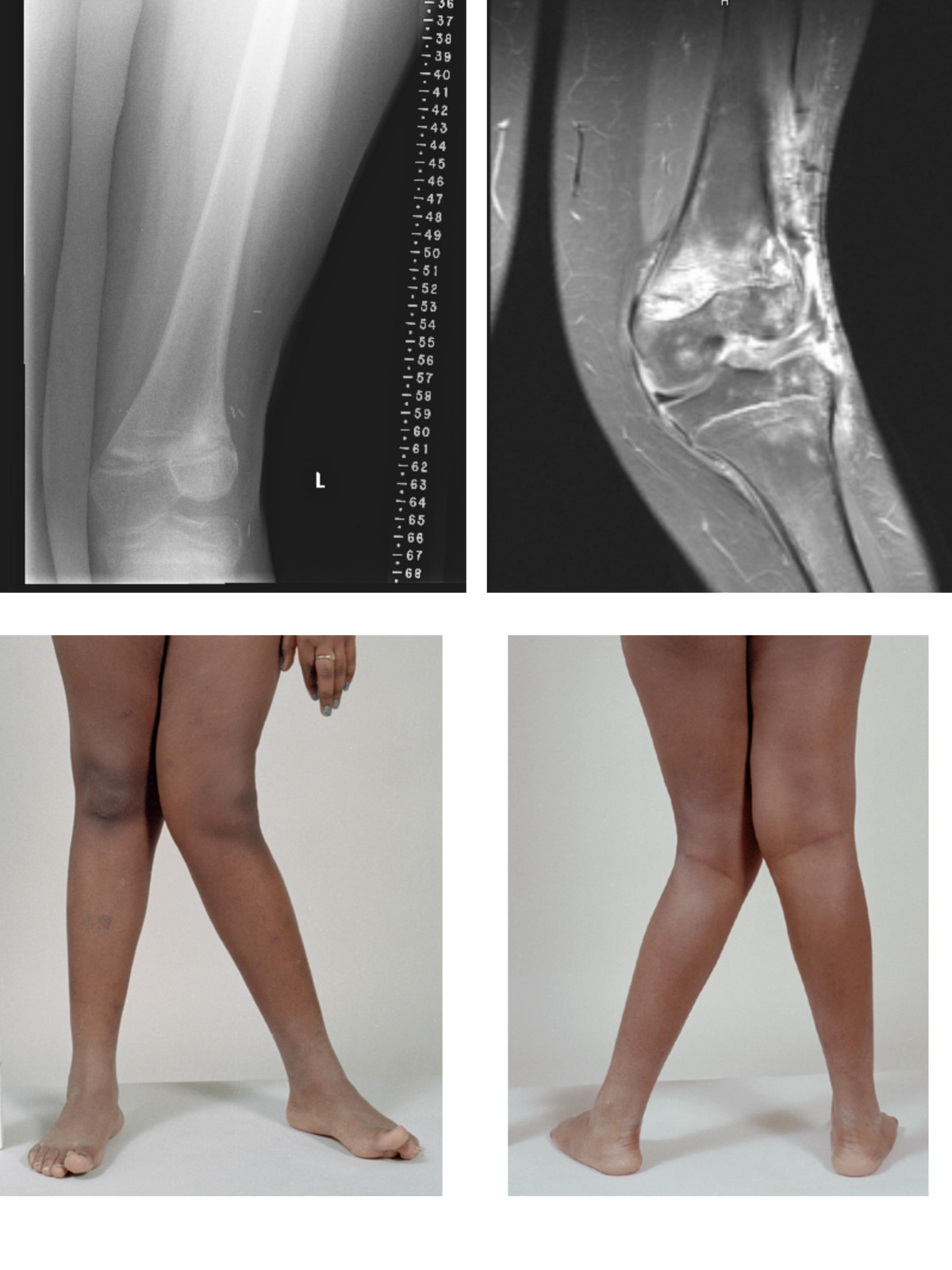
- A very severe case of genu valgum of the left knee following bone cancer treatment
- Specialty: Medical genetics

Genu valgum, commonly called "knock-knee", is a condition in which the knees angle in and touch each other when the legs are straightened. Individuals with severe valgus deformities are typically unable to touch their feet together while simultaneously straightening the legs. The term originates from Latin genu 'knee' and valgus 'bent outwards', but is also used to describe the distal portion of the knee joint which bends outwards and thus the proximal portion seems to be bent inwards.

Mild genu valgum is diagnosed when a person standing upright with the feet touching also shows the knees touching. It can be seen in children from ages 2 to 5, and is often corrected naturally as children grow. The condition may continue or worsen with age, particularly when it is the result of a disease, such as rickets. Idiopathic genu valgum is a form that is either congenital or has no known cause.

Other systemic conditions may be associated, such as Schnyder crystalline corneal dystrophy, an autosomal dominant condition frequently reported with hyperlipidemia.

== Causes ==
Genu valgum can arise from a variety of causes including nutritional, genetic, traumatic, idiopathic or physiologic and infectious.

=== Rickets ===
Nutritional rickets is an important cause of childhood genu valgum or knock knees in some parts of the world. Nutritional rickets arises from unhealthy life style habits as insufficient exposure to sun light which is the main source of vitamin D. Insufficient dietary intake of calcium is another contributing factor. Genu valgum may arise from rickets caused by genetic abnormalities, called vitamin D-resistant rickets or X-linked hypophosphatemia.

=== Osteochondrodysplasia ===
Osteochondrodysplasia are a variable group of genetic bone diseases or genetic skeletal dysplasias that present with generalized bone deformities involving all extremities and the spine. Genu valgum or knock knees is one of the known skeletal manifestations of Osteochondrodysplasias. A complete bone X-ray survey is mandatory to reach a definitive diagnosis.

==== St. Helena familial genu valgum ====
St. Helena familial genu valgum is a very rare genetic disorder which is characterized by post-puberty genu valgum and misalignment at the elbows and wrists of variable severity. It is inherited in an autosomal dominant manner. It has been described in 2 families from St. Helena and Iran.

== Diagnosis ==
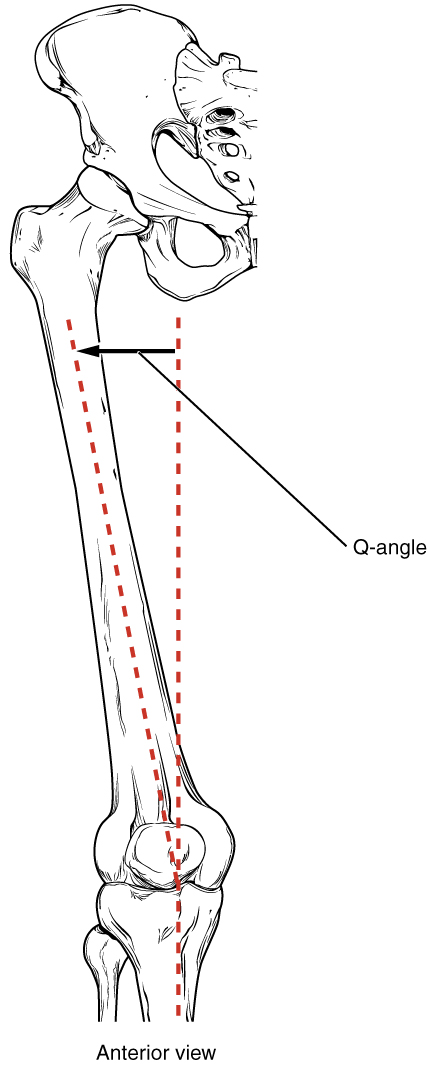
Image showing how Q-angle is measured

The degree of genu valgum can clinically be estimated by the Q angle, which is the angle formed by a line drawn from the anterior superior iliac spine through the center of the patella and a line drawn from the center of the patella to the center of the tibial tubercle. In women, the Q angle should be less than 22 degrees with the knee in extension and less than 9 degrees with the knee in 90 degrees of flexion. In men, the Q angle should be less than 18 degrees with the knee in extension and less than 8 degrees with the knee in 90 degrees of flexion. A typical Q angle is 12 degrees for men and 17 degrees for women.

=== Radiography ===
On projectional radiography, the degree of varus or valgus deformity can be quantified by the hip-knee-ankle angle, which is an angle between the femoral mechanical axis and the center of the ankle joint. It is normally between 1.0° and 1.5° of varus in adults. Normal ranges are different in children.

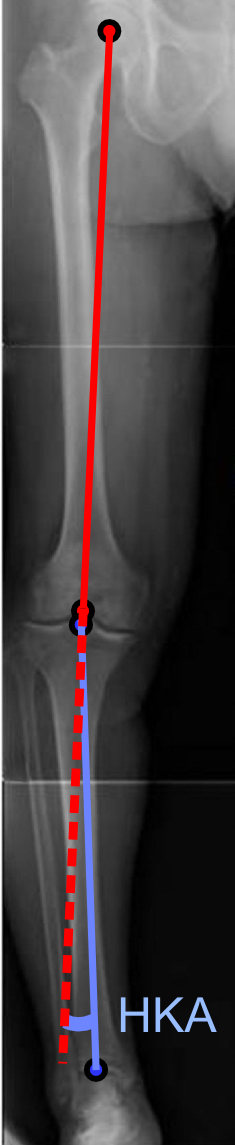
Hip-knee-ankle angle

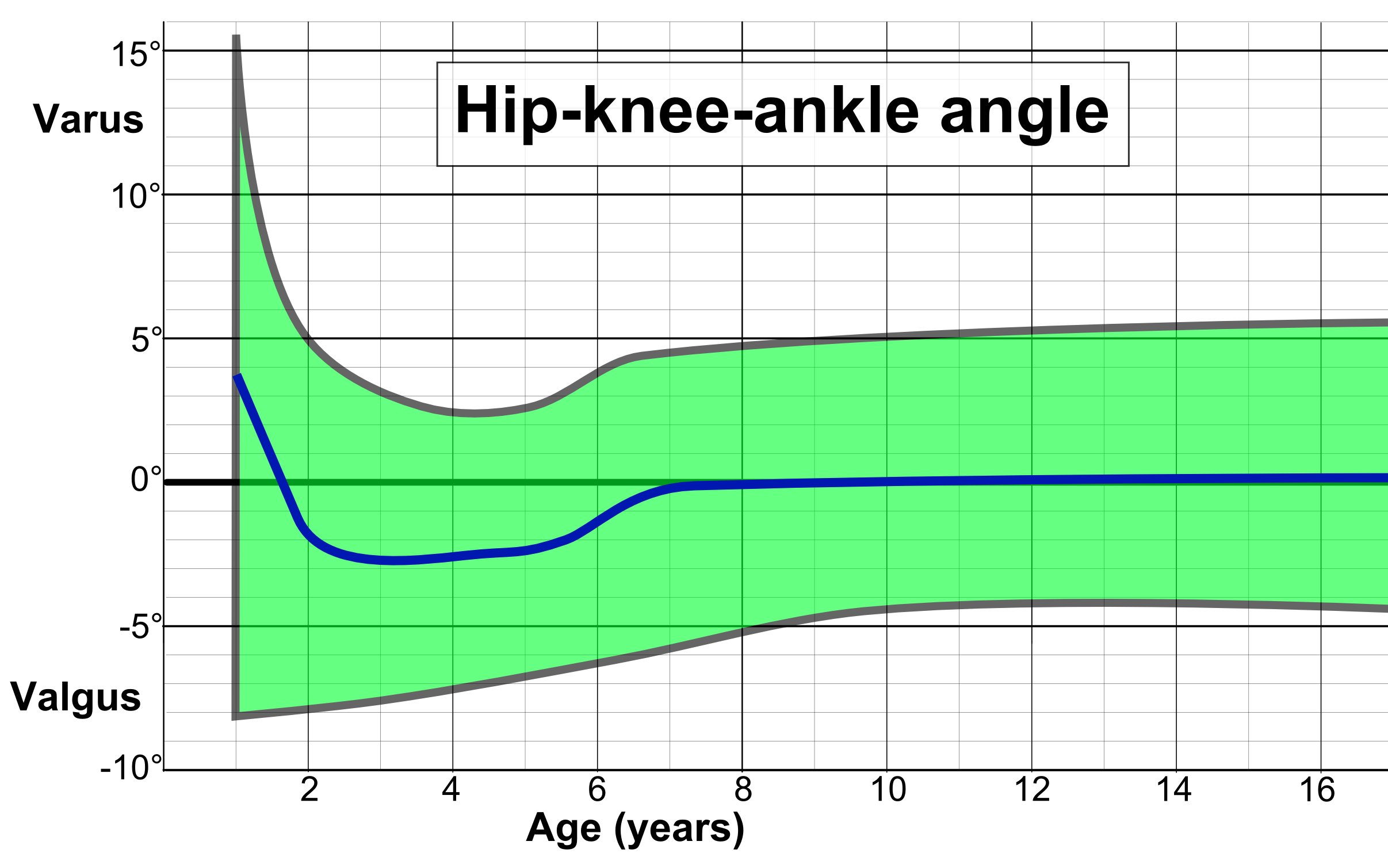
Hip-knee-ankle angle by age, with 95% prediction interval

== Treatment ==
The treatment of genu valgum in children depends on the underlying cause. Developmental also known as idiopathic genu valgum is usually self-limiting and resolves during childhood. Genu valgum secondary to nutritional rickets is typically treated with lifestyle modifications in the form of adequate sun exposure to ensure receiving the daily requirements of vitamin D and nutrition with a rich calcium diet. Additionally, calcium and vitamin D supplementations may be used. Some residual genu valgum deformities of healed nutritional rickets tend to improve spontaneously over time provided they maintain the healed status with no relapse of rachitic activity. Younger and middle-aged children under the age of eight years are more likely to remodel or self-correct spontaneously without the need for corrective surgery. Similarly, children with moderate deformities are more likely to remodel or self-correct spontaneously. This applies to angular knee deformities in general namely genu valgum and genu varum. Children with more severe deformities and those over the age of eight years (older children) are less likely to remodel spontaneously. Corrective surgery in the form of guided growth may be considered in such patients. Guided growth is the most common surgical intervention used to straighten the deformed bone. Genu valgum arising from osteochondrodysplasia usually needs repeated guided growth surgical interventions. Genu valgum secondary to trauma depends on the degree of physical damage. Usually, limb reconstruction procedures are needed, especially if trauma occurs in the early years of life where the anticipated remaining longitudinal bone growth is great.

The treatment of genu valgum in adults depends on the underlying cause and the degree of joint involvement namely arthritis. Bone corrective osteotomies and prosthetic joint replacement may be used depending upon the patient's age and symptomatology in terms of pain and functional impairment. Weight loss and substitution of high-impact for low-impact exercise can help slow progression of the condition. With every step, the patient's weight places a distortion on the knee toward a knocked knee position, and the effect is increased with increased angle or increased weight. Even in the normal knee position, the femurs function at an angle because they connect to the hip girdle at points much further apart than they connect at the knees.

Working with a physical medicine specialist such as a physiatrist, or a physiotherapist may assist a patient in learning how to improve outcomes and use the leg muscles properly to support the bone structures. Alternative or complementary treatments may include certain procedures from Iyengar Yoga or the Feldenkrais Method.

== See also ==
- Genu varum (bow-legs)
- Genu recurvatum (back knee)
- Knee pain
- Knee osteoarthritis
