= Cubitus varus =

Deformity involving inward deviation of an extended forearm

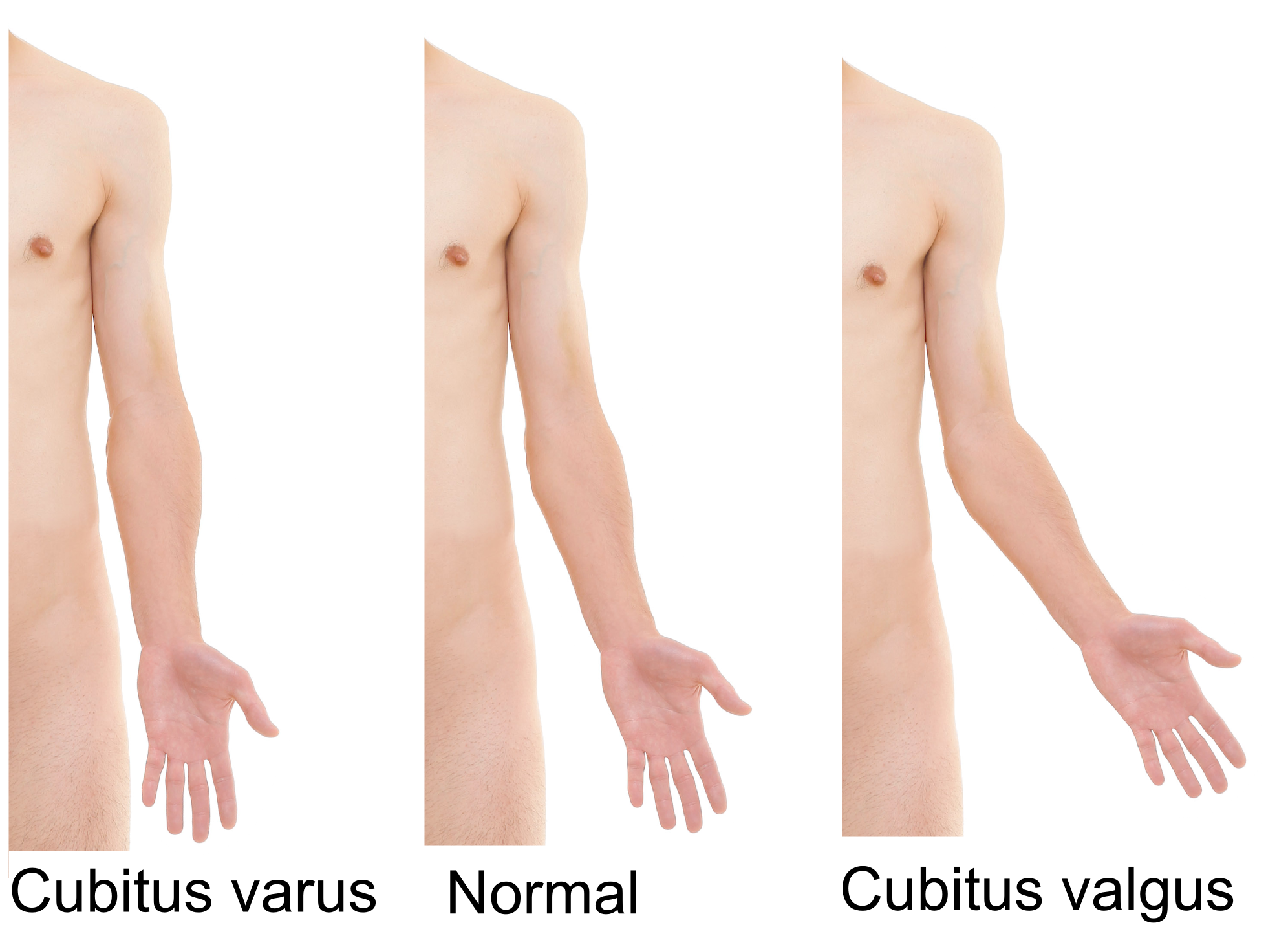
- Cubitus varus versus cubitus valgus
- Specialty: Rheumatology, medical genetics

Cubitus varus is a varus deformity in which the extended forearm is deviated towards midline of the body.

Cubitus varus is often referred to as "Gunstock deformity", due to the crooked nature of the healing.

The "opposite" condition is cubitus valgus.

== Signs and symptoms ==
=== Complications ===
Instances in which the medial epicondyle of the distal humerus is malformed due to the initial fracture at the humeral endplate may result in subluxation (snapping) of the ulnar nerve over the medial epicondyle with active flexion and extension of the elbow. In such instances, conductance of the ulnar nerve may be compromised due to chronic irritation, potentially resulting in irreversible ulnar neuropathy.

== Causes ==
A common cause is a supracondylar fracture of the humerus. It can be corrected via a corrective osteotomy of the humerus and either internal or external fixation of the bone until union.

== Diagnosis ==
Cubitus varus is not able to be diagnosed until after healing of the prior fracture, as the arm must be in full extension, not flexion, for the deformity to be noticed.

== Prognosis ==
A cubitus varus deformity is more cosmetic than limiting of any function, however internal rotation of the radius over the ulna may be limited due to the overgrowth of the humerus. This may be noticeable during an activity such as using a computer mouse.
