= Trimalleolar fracture =

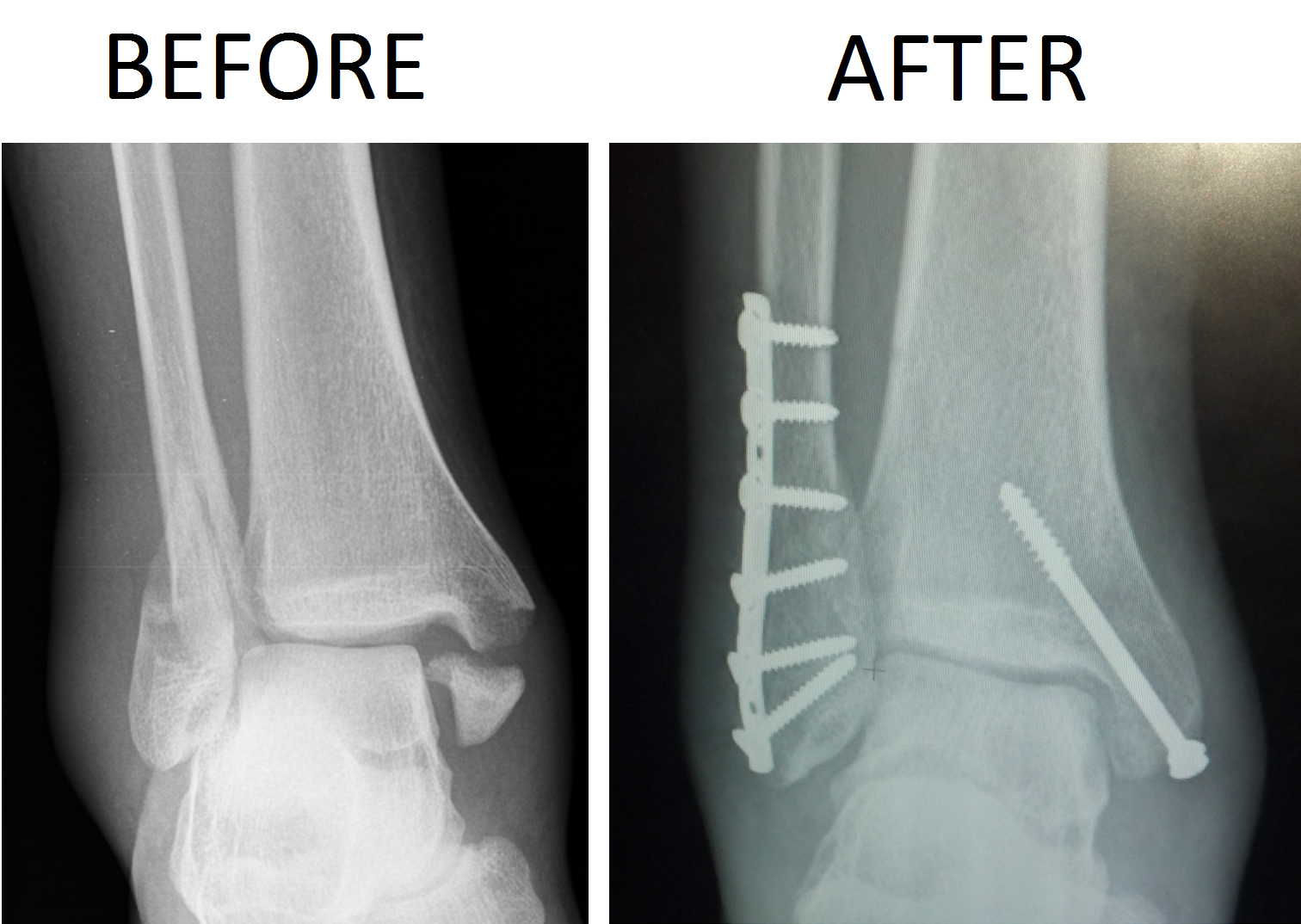
- X-ray of trimalleolar fracture repair before and after ORIF surgery
- Specialty: Orthopedics

A trimalleolar fracture is a fracture of the ankle that involves the lateral malleolus, the medial malleolus, and the distal posterior aspect of the tibia, which can be termed the posterior malleolus. The trauma is sometimes accompanied by ligament damage and dislocation.

The three aforementioned parts of bone articulate with the talus bone of the foot. Strictly speaking, there are only two malleoli (medial and lateral), but the term trimalleolar is used nevertheless and as such is a misnomer. The trimalleolar fracture is also known as cotton fracture.

== Treatment ==
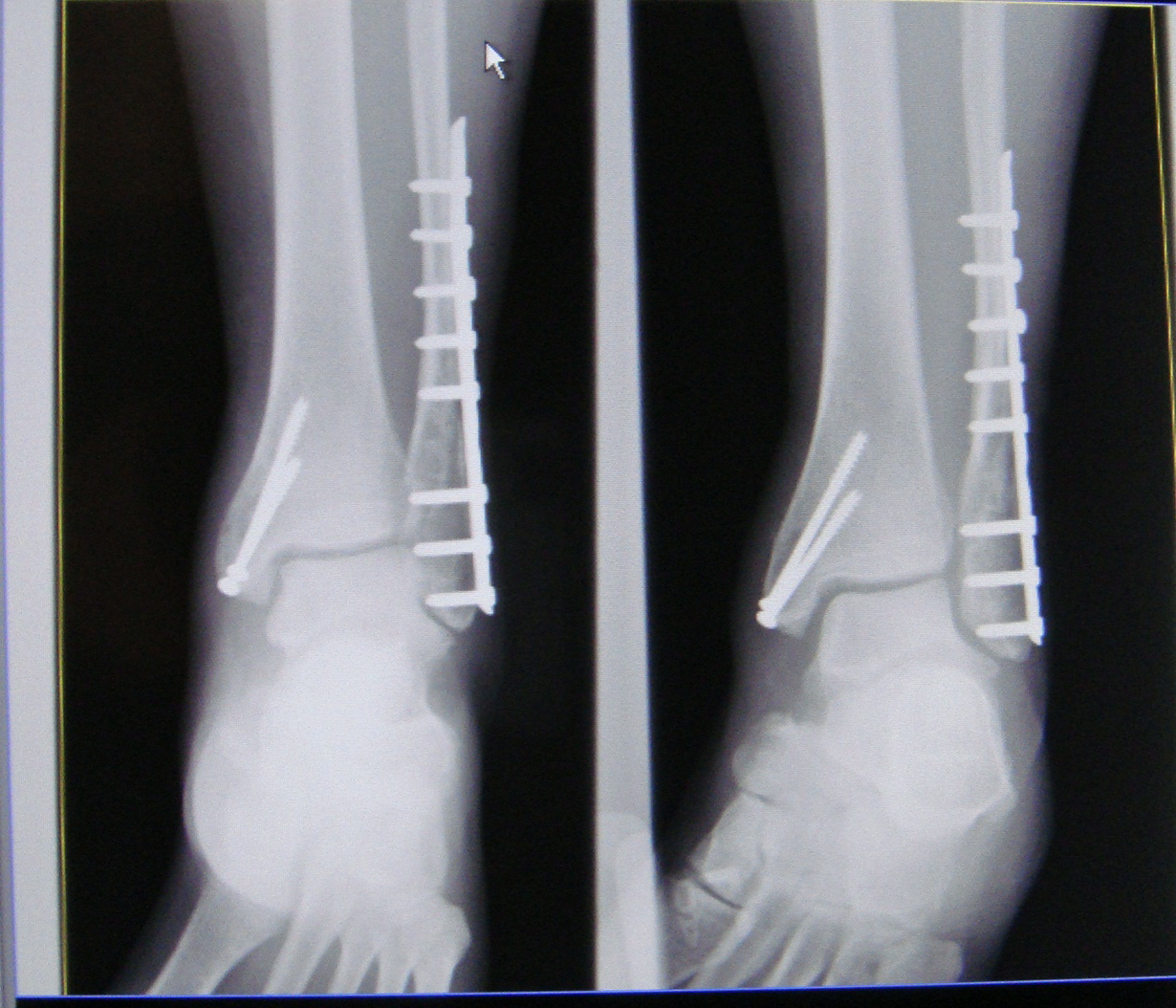
X-ray of trimalleolar fracture repair with plate and nails

Surgical repair using open reduction and internal fixation is generally required, and because there is no lateral restraint of the foot, the ankle cannot bear any weight while the bone knits. This typically takes six weeks in an otherwise healthy person, but can take as much as twelve weeks. Non-surgical treatment may sometimes be considered in cases where the patient has significant health problems or where the risk of surgery may be too great.
