= Broström procedure =

- ICD-9-CM: 81.49

The Broström operation (or Broström-Gould technique) is a repair of ligaments on lateral ankle. It is designed to address ankle instability. More importantly, it is primarily used to repair the anterior talofibular ligament (ATFL) in the ankle. It is thought that the majority of patients regain most function in their ankles. The recovery time for the procedure varies according to the patient but usually takes a minimum of 3–6 months.

== Purpose ==
Acute ankle sprains are most frequently treated conservatively, although some surgeons may advocate acute repairs in certain situations. Surgery is indicated for chronic sprains with persistent ankle instability despite well-designed conservative management.

== Description ==
Surgical Technique:

Incision is made over border of lateral malleolus; peroneal tendon exploration would require a posterolateral longitudinal incision;
Surgeons care for peroneal tendons, sural nerve and lesser saphenous vein (which might be ligated), and branches of the superficial peroneal nerve;
Proceeding through subcutaneous tissue, identify and preserve the inferior extensor retinaculum;
- this is mobilized for later attachment to the anterior edge of the fibula;
- identify the ATFL, if it is torn, it is usually torn from the fibula;
- make anterior capsular incision, leaving a small cuff of tissue, identify the calcaneofibular ligament (CFL) at the inferior tip of the fibula;ankle is then placed in valgus and dorsiflexion, and the redundancy of the ligament is assessed; sutures are passed through the proximal edges of the ATFL and CFL; drill holes are made in the distal fibula; sutures are passed through the drill holes, and are tied; the posterior edge of the extensor retinaculum is then opposed to the anterior edge of the fibula;

Post op care: - Standard involves 6 weeks of casting, but there is some evidence that there are better functional results with 3 weeks of casting.

== Possible complications ==
Since this is a surgical procedure complications can occur. Some patients may experience an infection at the incision site. If an infection occurs, they can almost always be cured with a course of oral antibiotics. Another complication is superficial peroneal nerve distribution sensation reduction. Generalized ligaments laxity may also occur. The over-tightening of ligaments may happen, although the implications of such over-tightening have yet to be studied. In some cases, the Brostrom repair has greatly decreased the patients' abilities to walk. Brostrom repair success rates tend to be over-estimated and are typically based on surgeons' reports of their patients rather than on long-term studies of the patients' self-reporting of improvements—or lack thereof. Since anaesthesia is used there is a chance of anaesthesia complications including adverse reactions or allergic reactions. A Brostrom repair should be considered a last resort after a patient has tried a series of non-surgical options, such as wearing a boot cast after the injury, going to physical therapy for an extended period of time, etc. Most ankle sprains can significantly improve without surgery.

== Outcome ==
Those who have had this procedure done are expected to have a stronger ankle, meaning their ankle will no longer give out on them. It is estimated that most patients who have this procedure experience restored stability. Success can be achieved regardless how soon the ankle is repaired after a patient's ankle instability issues occur, but the results are slightly better when the surgery is performed sooner. According to another study, most patients reported good to excellent results. Their ankles felt stable, and after they completely recovered, they noticed improved stability and significant restoration of function. However, patients may still experience temporary soreness in the ankle upon returning to sports or other physical activity. Swelling may also occur after exercise. In which case, doctors recommend continually icing even after full recovery from the procedure. Any pre-existing arthritis stage in upper or lower ankle joints will not be changed through this procedure and may act as a factor in decision making of pros and cons. In certain high-demand individuals, the Broström-Gould procedure alone may provide an inadequate repair, and augmentation with an Evans procedure should be considered.
