= SAS =

SAS or Sas may refer to:

== Military ==
- Special Air Service, a special forces unit of the British Army
- Special Air Service Regiment, a special forces unit of the Australian Army
- 5th Special Air Service, a Belgian Second World War formation
- Canadian Special Air Service Company, 1947–1949
- 1st Marine Infantry Parachute Regiment, sometimes referred to as the "French SAS"
- New Zealand Special Air Service, a special forces unit of the New Zealand Army
- Rhodesian Special Air Service, several special forces units from Rhodesia
- Special Air Service, a unit within the Special Forces of Zimbabwe
- South African Ship, the South African Navy warship prefix
- Specialized Administrative Sections, a French civil-military program during the Algerian War
- Underwater Defence (Turkish Armed Forces) (Su Altı Savunma), a unit of the Turkish Navy

== Arts, entertainment and media ==
=== Film and television ===
- SAS (TV station), in Adelaide, South Australia
- SAS: Are You Tough Enough?, a British documentary series 2002–2004
- SAS: Red Notice, a 2021 action thriller film
- SAS: Rogue Heroes, a 2022 British historical drama TV series
- SAS: Who Dares Wins, a 2015 British reality TV series

=== Other uses in arts, entertainment and media ===
- SAS (novel series), by Gérard de Villiers, 1965–2013
- Southern All Stars, a Japanese rock band
- Strong Arm Steady, an American hip hop group from California
- SAS: Secure Tomorrow, a 2008 video game
- SAS Zombie Assault, video game series by Ninja Kiwi

== Businesses and organizations ==
=== Businesses ===
- SAS Group, Swedish airline holding company
  - Scandinavian Airlines, stylized as SAS
- SAS Institute, American developer of analytics and AI software
- SAS (shoemakers), American shoe manufacturer
- SAS (TV station), in Adelaide, South Australia
- Société par actions simplifiée, a French type of business entity
- Andalusian Health Service (Servicio Andaluz de Salud), in Spain
- Scottish Ambulance Service, part of NHS Scotland

=== Education ===
==== Asia ====
- Sultan Alam Shah School, in Malaysia
- Shanghai American School, in Shanghai
- Singapore American School, in Singapore

==== Europe ====
- Sankt-Ansgar-Schule, in Hamburg, Germany
- School of Advanced Study, of the University of London, England
- Slovak Academy of Sciences, the main scientific and research institution in Slovakia
- Studia Academica Slovaca, in Bratislava, Slovakia

==== United States ====
- Saint Andrew's School (Florida)
- Saint Andrew's School (Georgia)
- School for Advanced Studies, in Miami, Florida
- Semester at Sea, a shipboard academic program

=== Other organizations ===
- Second Amendment Sisters, US women's gun rights advocacy group
- Servants Anonymous Society, a nonprofit women's organization
- Freedom and Solidarity (Sloboda a Solidarita), a political party in Slovakia
- Society for Amateur Scientists, an American non-profit organization
- Society for Animation Studies, an international scholarly organization
- Space Access Society, for increasing access to space travel
- Strong American Schools, an American non-profit organization that promotes sound education policies
- Surfers Against Sewage, a British marine conservation charity
- Surrey Archaeological Society, England
- Sussex Archaeological Society, England

== People ==
- Éva Sas (born 1970), French politician
- Ferenc Sas (1915–1988), Hungarian footballer
- Hasan Şaş (born 1976), Turkish footballer
- Julian Sas (born 1970), Dutch guitarist, singer and songwriter
- Sas of Moldavia (died 1358), voivode of Moldavia 1354–1358
- Stephen A. Smith (born 1967), American sports media personality

== Places ==
- Šas, Montenegro
- Sas, Iran, or Eslamabad
- Sas van Gent, Netherlands
- Sas (hill), Poland
- Sas, a tributary of the river Bouleț in Romania

== Science and technology ==
=== Medicine ===
- Space adaptation syndrome, or space sickness
- Subvalvular aortic stenosis (canine), a heart murmur in dogs
- Syndesmotic ankle sprain, a type of ankle sprain
- Specialist, associate specialist and specialty doctors, a grade of doctor in the UK

=== Computing ===
- SAS (software), a statistical software suite developed by SAS Institute
- SAS language, a computer programming language
- Secure attention key or secure attention sequence, a key combination pressed before a login screen
- Serial Attached SCSI, a point-to-point serial protocol
- Short Authentication String, a method used in the ZRTP cryptographic protocol
- Sorcerer's Apprentice syndrome, a network protocol flaw in TFTP
- Spatially aware sublayer, in Resilient Packet Ring
- Switched Access Services (SAS) an internal telephone company system to remotely monitor lines

=== Space ===
- Small Astronomy Satellite (disambiguation), one of three of NASA-operated space telescopes
- Space activity suit, or mechanical counterpressure suit
- Sistema Avariynogo Spaseniya, the Soyuz launch escape system

=== Other uses in science and technology ===
- Self-anchored suspension bridge
- Side-angle-side, a concept in geometry for determining congruence or similarity of triangles
- Small-angle scattering, a scattering technique based on the deflection of a beam of particles away from the straight trajectory
- Saturated absorption spectroscopy
- Stability augmentation system, a type of automatic flight control system
- Synthetic aperture sonar
- Supercritical Anti-Solvent, a method used for micronization of substances

== Sport ==
- San Antonio Spurs, a basketball team in San Antonio, Texas, US
- SAS Championship, a golf tournament on the PGA Tour Champions
- Stars Association for Sports, a women's football club in Aley, Lebanon

== Transportation ==
- Salton Sea Airport, U.S., IATA airport code SAS
- Sam Shing stop, Hong Kong, MTR station code SAS
- San Antonio station (Texas), U.S., Amtrak code SAS
- Second Avenue Subway, New York City, U.S.
- St Annes-on-the-Sea railway station, England, station code SAS

== Other uses ==
- Sas coat of arms, a central European coat of arms
- Statements on auditing standards, a series of internationally recognized auditing standards

== See also ==
- History of the SAS (disambiguation)
- Saas (disambiguation)
- Sass (disambiguation)
- SA (disambiguation), for the singular of SAs
- SASES
- Sases
