= Evans technique =

- Specialty: Orthopedic

The Evans technique is a surgical procedure to treat the mechanical instability of the lateral ankle ligaments.

In the Evans procedure, the peroneus brevis muscle is separated from its musculotendinous compound and its proximal end is sutured to the peroneus longus. Then, an aperture is created from the postero-superior side of the fibula to the lateral malleolar tip. The tendon is then passed from the anterior side towards the posterior side through this aperture and sutured on itself. This procedure was designed to prevent talar tilt by reducing foot inversion and deterring chronic ankle instability.

The disadvantage of the Evans procedure is its inability to restore the normal anatomical position of the anterior talofibular ligament. Hence, the stability at inversion is restored. The plantar pressure changes after the modified Evans procedure have not been measured. It is hypothesized that the modified Evans procedure will improve plantar pressure balance in lateral ankle instability.
