= Sass =

Sass, Saß or SASS may refer to:

== Businesses and organizations ==
- Safe Amplification Site Society, a Canadian non-profit organization
- Shanghai Academy of Social Sciences, a Chinese think tank
- Society for the Advancement of Scandinavian Study
- South African Secret Service
- Saint Andrew's Secondary School, Singapore
- Sabarimala Ayyappa Seva Samajam, an organisation of Ayyappan devotees
- Single Action Shooting Society, a shooting sport organization

== People ==
- Sass (surname), including a list of people with the name
- Sass Jordan (Sarah Jordan, born 1962), Canadian singer
- Sass Henno (born 1982), Estonian writer

== Other uses ==
- Cassandra Freedman, or Sass, a fictional character in Neighbours
- 3,4-Methylenedioxyamphetamine, sometimes called sass, a stimulant and psychedelic drug
- Sass (style sheet language)
- Sass (music), a subgenre of post-hardcore music
- M110 Semi-Automatic Sniper System (SASS), a rifle

== See also ==
- Sasse (disambiguation)
- Sassy (disambiguation)
- Saas (disambiguation)
- SAS (disambiguation)
- Sass & Bide, Australian fashion label
- SASS-C, the Surveillance Analysis Support System for ATC-Centre
