= Sassy =

Sassy may refer to:

== Arts and entertainment ==
=== Music ===
- Sassy (album), by Sarah Vaughan, 1956
- "Sassy", a song by Hole from Pretty on the Inside, 1991
- "Sassy", a song by Kat Graham, 2010
- "Sassy", a song by the Manhattan Transfer from The Offbeat of Avenues, 1991
- "Sassy", a song by Rapsody from Laila's Wisdom, 2017

=== Other uses in arts and entertainment ===
- Sassy, a character in Ted Lasso
- Sassy, a character in Homeward Bound: The Incredible Journey
- Sassy (magazine), an American teen magazine for young women 1988–1996

== People ==
- Sassy Pandez (fl. from 2009), English DJ and model
- Sassy Ross (fl. from 2016), Saint Lucia–born poet
- Sassy Stephie (Stephanie Sager, born 1984), American professional wrestler
- Sassy 009 (fl. from 2017), Scandinavian musician Sunniva Lindgård
- Sarah Vaughan (1924–1990), nicknamed Sassy, American jazz singer
- Sassy, a member of Japanese band High and Mighty Color

== Other uses ==
- Sassy, Calvados, a commune in France
- Sassy, a subsidiary of Kid Brands
- SCUBA-2 All Sky Survey (SASSy), an astronomical survey

== See also ==
- SA-C (programming language) (pronounced "sassy")
- Sass (disambiguation)
- Sasse (disambiguation)
- My Sassy Girl (disambiguation)
