= Talofibular ligament =

Talofibular ligament can refer to:

- Anterior talofibular ligament (ligamentum talofibulare anterius)
- Posterior talofibular ligament (ligamentum talofibulare posterius)
