= Ankle =

Region where the foot and the leg meet

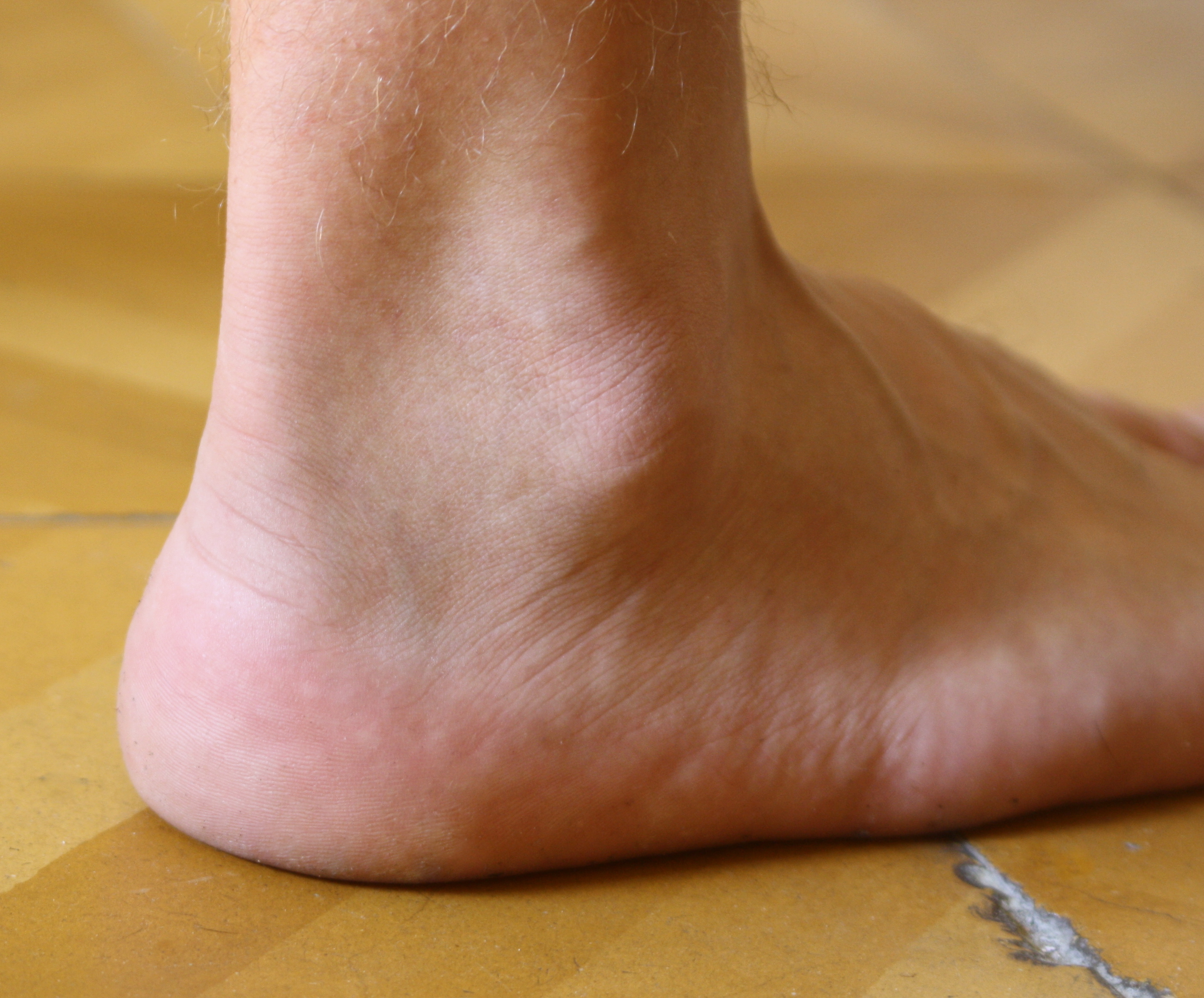
- Human ankle

- Lateral view of the human ankle

Details

Identifiers
- Latin: tarsus
- MeSH: D000842
- TA98: A01.1.00.041
- TA2: 165
- FMA: 9665

The ankle or the talocrural region is the area where the foot and the leg meet. The ankle includes three joints: the ankle joint proper or talocrural joint, the subtalar joint, and the inferior tibiofibular joint. The movements produced at this joint are dorsiflexion and plantarflexion of the foot. In common usage, the term ankle refers exclusively to the ankle region. In medical terminology, "ankle" (without qualifiers) can refer broadly to the region or specifically to the talocrural joint.

The main bones of the ankle region are the talus (in the foot), the tibia, and fibula (both in the leg). The talocrural joint is a synovial hinge joint that connects the distal ends of the tibia and fibula in the lower limb with the proximal end of the talus. The articulation between the tibia and the talus bears more weight than that between the smaller fibula and the talus.

== Structure ==
=== Region ===
The ankle region is found at the junction of the leg and the foot. It extends downwards (distally) from the narrowest point of the lower leg. It includes the parts of the foot closer to the body (proximal) to the heel and upper surface (dorsum) of the foot.

=== Ankle joints ===
The ankle is composed of three joints: the talocrural joint (also called talotibial joint, tibiotalar joint, talar mortise, talar joint), the subtalar joint (also called talocalcaneal), and the Inferior tibiofibular joint. The joint surface of all bones in the ankle is covered with articular cartilage.

The talocrural joint is the only mortise and tenon joint in the human body, the term likening the skeletal structure to the woodworking joint of the same name. The bony architecture of the ankle consists of three bones: the tibia, the fibula, and the talus. The articular surface of the tibia may be referred to as the plafond (French for "ceiling").

The medial malleolus is a bony process extending distally off the medial tibia. The distal-most aspect of the fibula is called the lateral malleolus. Together, the malleoli, along with their supporting ligaments, stabilize the talus underneath the tibia.

Because the motion of the subtalar joint provides a significant contribution to positioning the foot, some authors will describe it as the lower ankle joint, and call the talocrural joint the upper ankle joint. Dorsiflexion and Plantarflexion are the movements that take place in the ankle joint. When the foot is plantar flexed, the ankle joint also allows some movements of side-to-side gliding, rotation, adduction, and abduction.

The bony arch formed by the tibial plafond and the two malleoli is referred to as the ankle "mortise" (or talar mortise). The mortise is a rectangular socket.

The distances between the bones in the ankle are as follows:

- Talus - medial malleolus : 1.70 ± 0.13 mm
- Talus - tibial plafond: 2.04 ± 0.29 mm
- Talus - lateral malleolus: 2.13 ± 0.20 mm

Decreased distances indicate osteoarthritis.

=== Ligaments ===
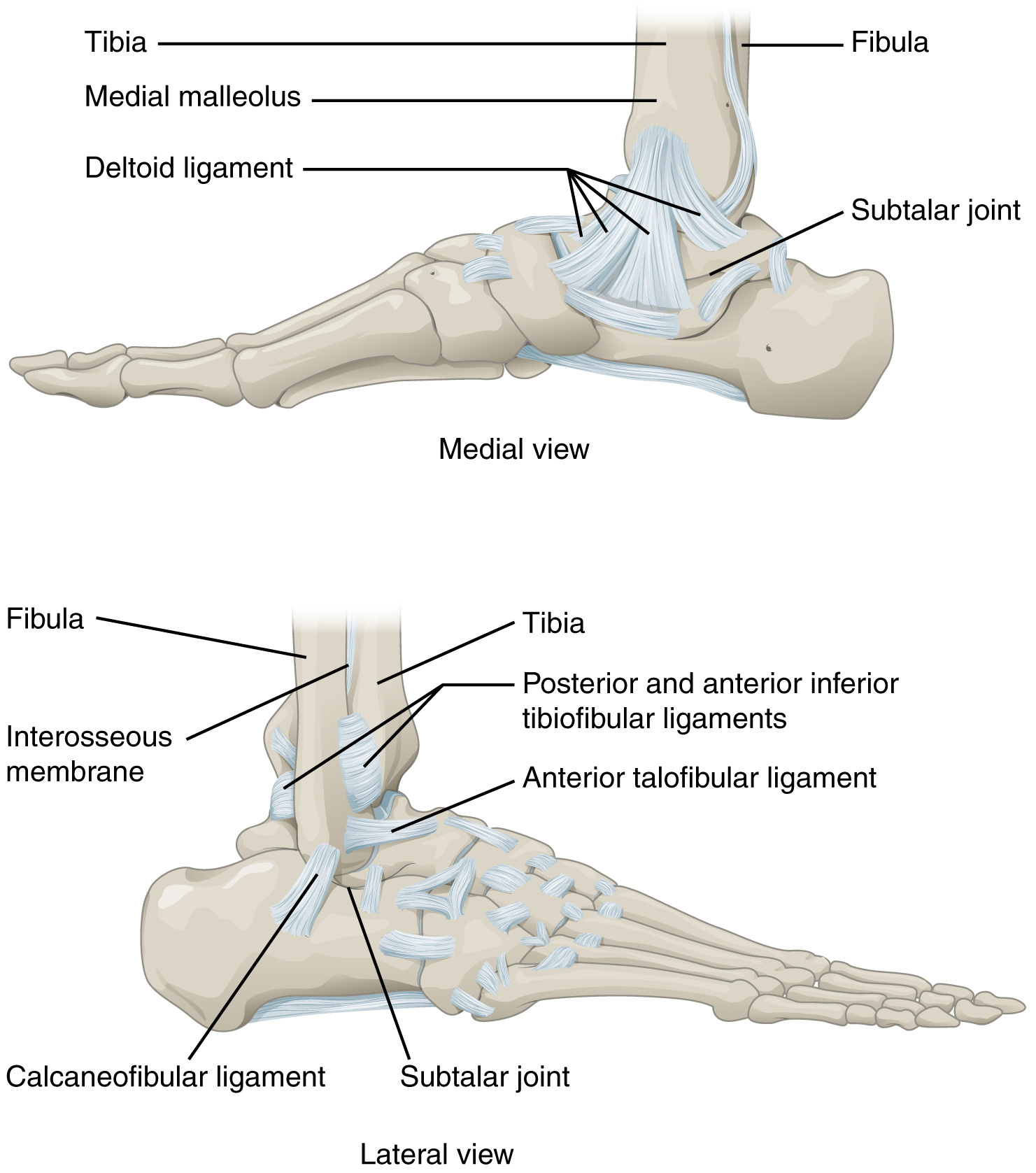
Ligaments of ankle and feet

The ankle joint is bound by the strong deltoid ligament and three lateral ligaments: the anterior talofibular ligament, the posterior talofibular ligament, and the calcaneofibular ligament.

- The deltoid ligament supports the medial side of the joint, and is attached at the medial malleolus of the tibia and connects in four places to the talar shelf of the calcaneus, calcaneonavicular ligament, the navicular tuberosity, and to the medial surface of the talus.
- The anterior and posterior talofibular ligaments support the lateral side of the joint from the lateral malleolus of the fibula to the dorsal and ventral ends of the talus.
- The calcaneofibular ligament is attached at the lateral malleolus and to the lateral surface of the calcaneus.

Though it does not span the ankle joint itself, the syndesmotic ligament makes an important contribution to the stability of the ankle. This ligament spans the syndesmosis, i.e., the articulation between the medial aspect of the distal fibula and the lateral aspect of the distal tibia. An isolated injury to this ligament is often called a high ankle sprain.

The bony architecture of the ankle joint is most stable in dorsiflexion. Thus, a sprained ankle is more likely to occur when the ankle is plantar-flexed, as ligamentous support is more important in this position. The classic ankle sprain involves the anterior talofibular ligament (ATFL), which is also the most commonly injured ligament during inversion sprains. Another ligament that can be injured in a severe ankle sprain is the calcaneofibular ligament.

=== Retinacula, tendons and their synovial sheaths, vessels, and nerves ===
Several tendons pass through the ankle region. Bands of connective tissue called retinacula (singular: retinaculum) allow the tendons to exert force across the angle between the leg and foot without lifting away from the angle, a process called bowstringing. The superior extensor retinaculum of foot extends between the anterior (forward) surfaces of the tibia and fibula near their lower (distal) ends. It contains the anterior tibial artery and vein and the tendons of the tibialis anterior muscle within its tendon sheath and the unsheathed tendons of extensor hallucis longus and extensor digitorum longus muscles. The deep peroneal nerve passes under the retinaculum, while the superficial peroneal nerve is outside of it. The inferior extensor retinaculum of foot is a Y-shaped structure. Its lateral attachment is on the calcaneus, and the band travels towards the anterior tibia, where it is attached and blends with the superior extensor retinaculum. Along with that course, the band divides, and another segment attaches to the plantar aponeurosis. The tendons that pass through the superior extensor retinaculum are all sheathed along their paths through the inferior extensor retinaculum, and the tendon of the fibularis tertius muscle is also contained within the retinaculum.

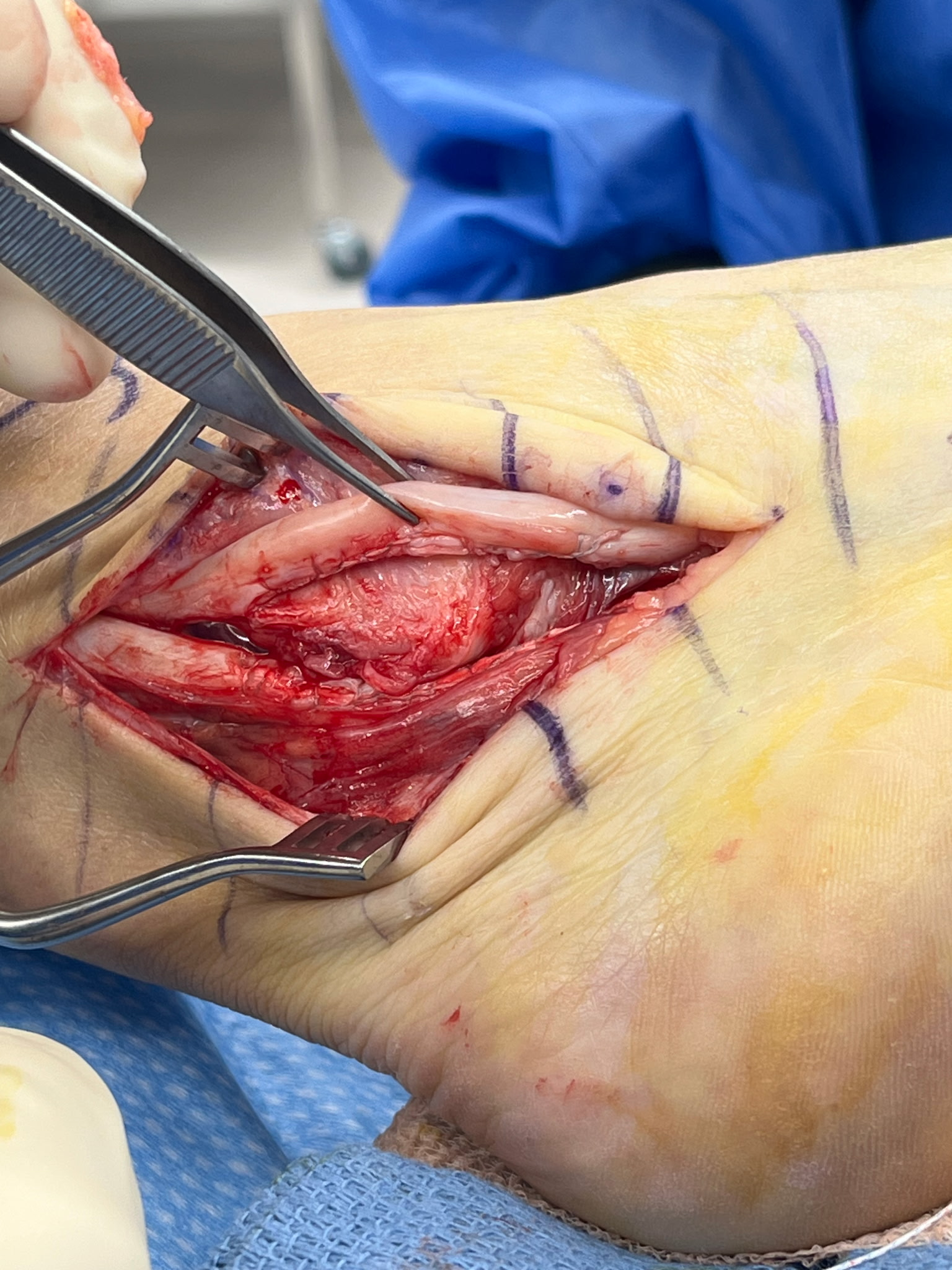
Intraoperative view during surgery on the fibularis longus tendon of the right foot in a male patient in his 60s.

The flexor retinaculum of foot extends from the medial malleolus to the medial process of the calcaneus, and the following structures in order from medial to lateral: the tendon of the tibialis posterior muscle, the tendon of the flexor digitorum longus muscle, the posterior tibial artery and vein, the tibial nerve, and the tendon of the flexor hallucis longus muscle.

The fibular retinacula hold the tendons of the fibularis longus and fibularis brevis along the lateral aspect of the ankle region. The superior fibular retinaculum extends from the deep transverse fascia of the leg and lateral malleolus to the calcaneus. The inferior fibular retinaculum is a continuous extension from the inferior extensor retinaculum to the calcaneus.

=== Mechanoreceptors ===
Mechanoreceptors of the ankle send proprioceptive sensory input to the central nervous system (CNS). Muscle spindles are thought to be the main type of mechanoreceptor responsible for proprioceptive attributes from the ankle. The muscle spindle gives feedback to the CNS system on the current length of the muscle it innervates and to any change in length that occurs.

It was hypothesized that muscle spindle feedback from the ankle dorsiflexors played the most substantial role in proprioception relative to other muscular receptors that cross at the ankle joint. However, due to the multi-planar range of motion at the ankle joint, there is not one group of muscles that is responsible for this. This helps to explain the relationship between the ankle and balance.

In 2011, a relationship between proprioception of the ankle and balance performance was seen in the CNS. This was done by using an fMRI machine in order to see the changes in brain activity when the receptors of the ankle are stimulated. This implicates the ankle directly with the ability to balance. Further research is needed to determine the extent to which the ankle affects balance.

== Function ==
Historically, the role of the ankle in locomotion has been discussed by Aristotle and Leonardo da Vinci. There is no question that ankle push-off is a significant force in human gait, but how much energy is used in leg swing as opposed to advancing the whole-body center of mass is not clear.

== Clinical significance ==
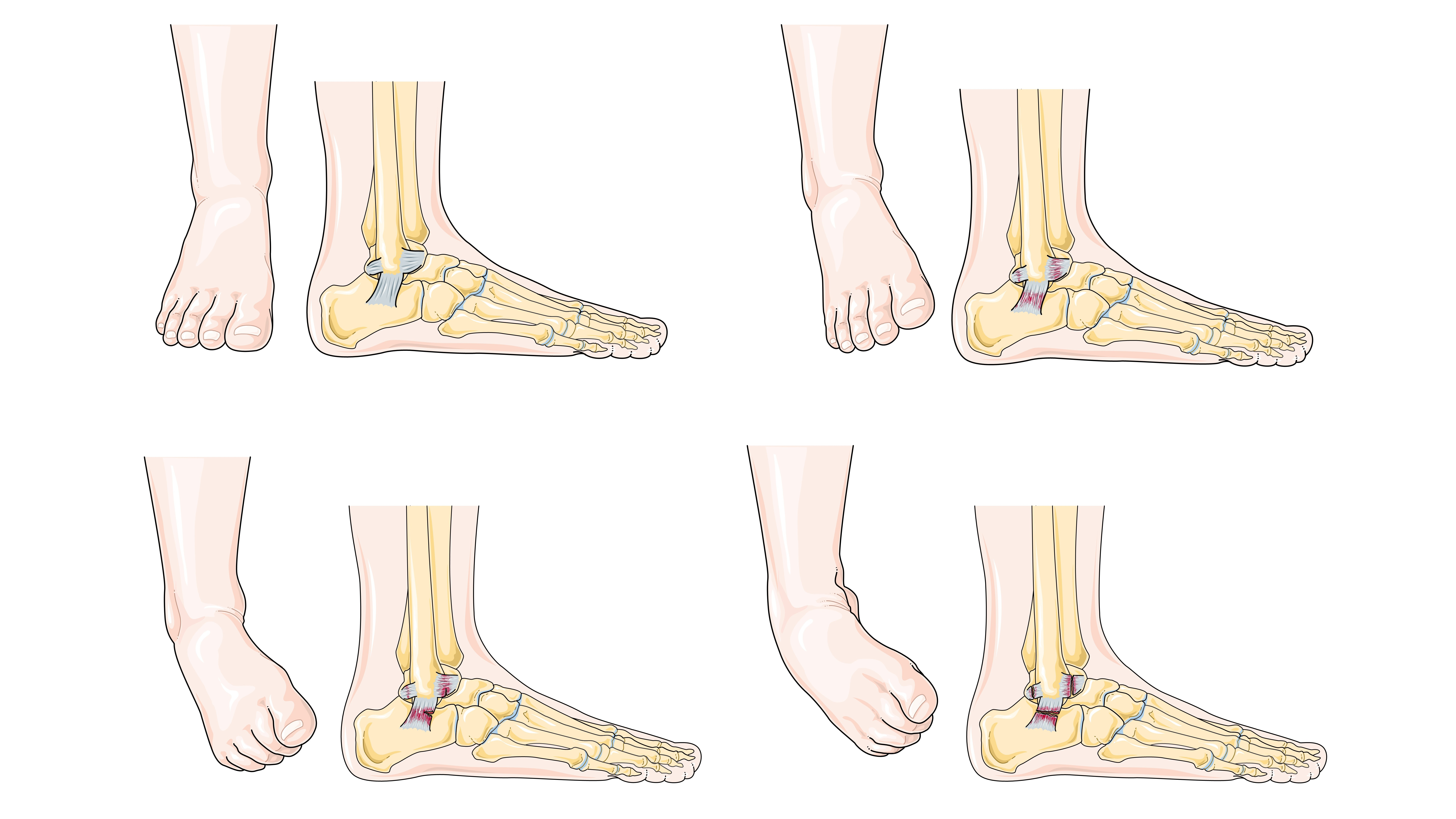
A diagram illustrating varying severity of ankle sprain

=== Traumatic injury ===
Of all major joints, the ankle is the most commonly injured. If the outside surface of the foot is twisted under the leg during weight bearing, the lateral ligament, especially the anterior talofibular portion, is subject to tearing (a sprain) as it is weaker than the medial ligament and it resists inward rotation of the talocrural joint.

==== Fractures ====
An ankle fracture is a break of one or more of the bones that make up the ankle joint. Symptoms may include pain, swelling, bruising, and an inability to walk on the injured leg. Complications may include an associated high ankle sprain, compartment syndrome, stiffness, malunion, and post-traumatic arthritis.

Ankle fractures may result from excessive stress on the joint such as from rolling an ankle or from blunt trauma. Types of ankle fractures include lateral malleolus, medial malleolus, posterior malleolus, bimalleolar, and trimalleolar fractures. The Ottawa ankle rule can help determine the need for X-rays. Special X-ray views called stress views help determine whether an ankle fracture is unstable.

Treatment depends on the fracture type. Ankle stability largely dictates non-operative vs. operative treatment. Non-operative treatment includes splinting or casting while operative treatment includes fixing the fracture with metal implants through an open reduction internal fixation (ORIF). Significant recovery generally occurs within four months while complete recovery usually takes up to one year.

Ankle fractures are common, occurring in over 1.8 per 1000 adults and 1 per 1000 children per year. In North America this figure increases to more than 14 in ever 10,000 patients admitted to the Emergency Room. They occur most commonly in young males and older females.

=== Imaging ===
The initial evaluation of suspected ankle pathology is usually by projectional radiography ("X-ray").

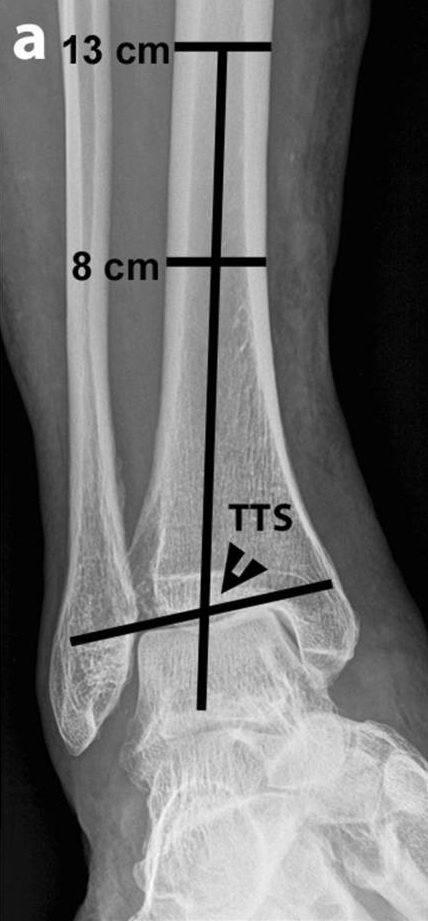
Tibiotalar surface angle (TTS)

Varus or valgus deformity, if suspected, can be measured with the frontal tibiotalar surface angle (TTS), formed by the mid-longitudinal tibial axis (such as through a line bisecting the tibia at 8 and 13 cm above the tibial plafond) and the talar surface. An angle of less than 84 degrees is regarded as talipes varus, and an angle of more than 94 degrees is regarded as talipes valgus.

For ligamentous injury, there are three main landmarks on X-rays: The first is the tibiofibular clear space, the horizontal distance from the lateral border of the posterior tibial malleolus to the medial border of the fibula, with greater than 5 mm being abnormal. The second is tibiofibular overlap, the horizontal distance between the medial border of the fibula and the lateral border of the anterior tibial prominence, with less than 10 mm being abnormal. The final measurement is the medial clear space, the distance between the lateral aspect of the medial malleolus and the medial border of the talus at the level of the talar dome, with a measurement greater than 4 mm being abnormal. Loss of any of these normal anatomic spaces can indirectly reflect ligamentous injury or occult fracture, and can be followed by MRI or CT.

=== Abnormalities ===
Clubfoot or talipes equinovarus, which occurs in one to two of every 1,000 live births, involves multiple abnormalities of the foot. Equinus refers to the downward deflection of the ankle, and is named for the walking on the toes in the manner of a horse. This does not occur because it is accompanied by an inward rotation of the foot (varus deformity), which untreated, results in walking on the sides of the feet. Treatment may involve manipulation and casting or surgery.

Ankle joint equinus, normally in adults, relates to restricted ankle joint range of motion(ROM). Calf muscle stretching exercises are normally helpful to increase the ankle joint dorsiflexion and used to manage clinical symptoms resulting from ankle equinus.

Occasionally a human ankle has a ball-and-socket ankle joint and fusion of the talo-navicular joint.

== History ==
The word ankle or ancle is common, in various forms, to Germanic languages, probably connected in origin with the Latin angulus, or Greek αγκυλος, meaning bent.

== Other animals ==
=== Evolution ===
It has been suggested that dexterous control of toes has been lost in favour of a more precise voluntary control of the ankle joint.

== See also ==
- Foot
- Leg

== Additional images ==
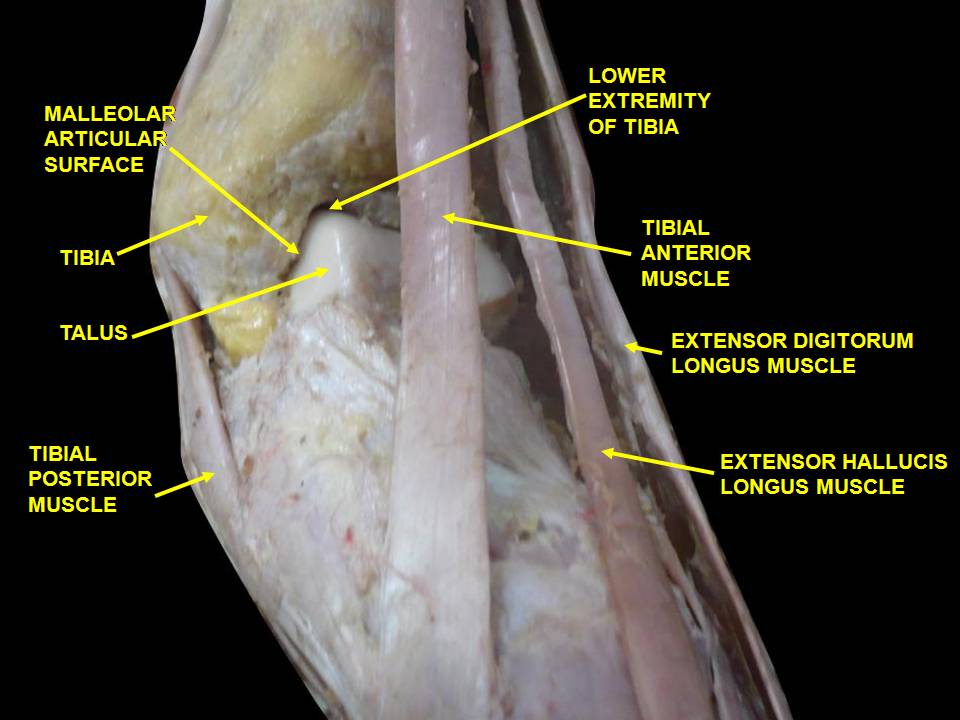
Dorsum of Foot. Ankle joint. Deep dissection.

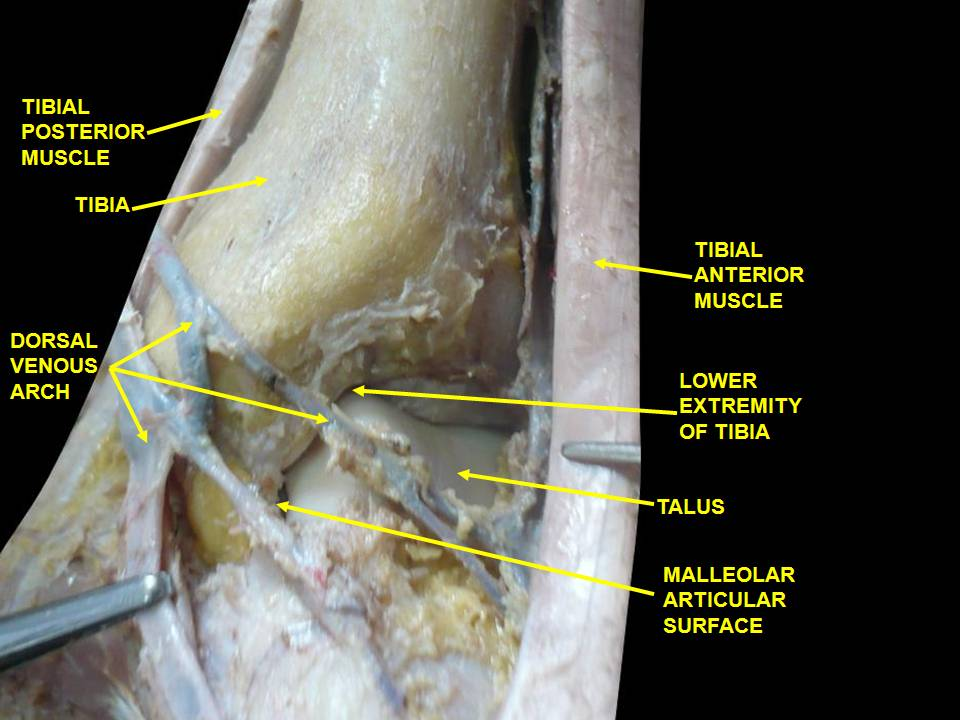
Dorsum of Foot. Ankle joint. Deep dissection.

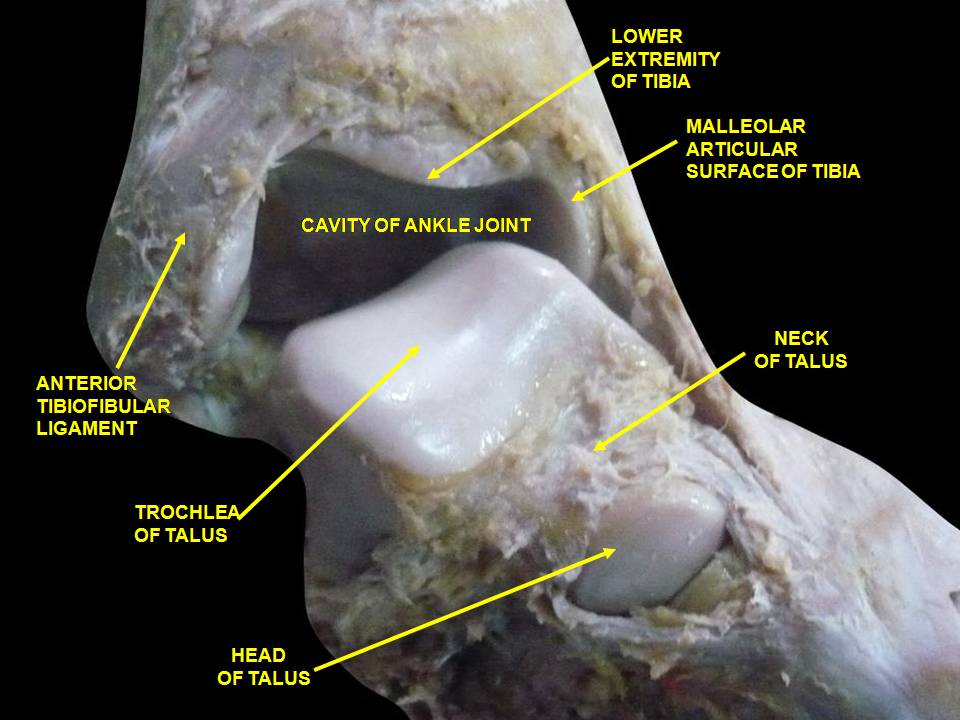
Ankle joint. Deep dissection. Anterior view.

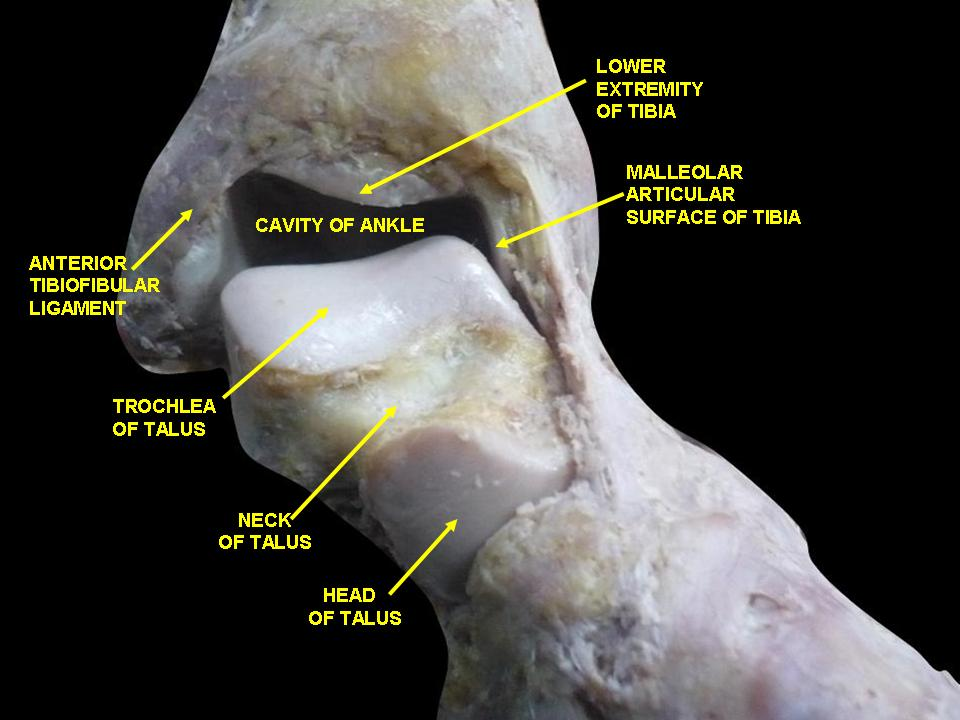
Dorsum of Foot. Ankle joint. Deep dissection.
