= Collateral ligament of ankle joint =

Collateral ligament of ankle joint may refer to:

- Deltoid ligament
- Lateral collateral ligament of ankle joint
