= Zas =

Zas may refer to:

== People ==
- Zas (surname)

== Places ==
- Zas, Naxos, Greece
- Zas, Spain

== Other ==
- zas, the ISO639 code for Albarradas Zapotec
- Žas, Lithuanian band
- ZAS Airline of Egypt
- Zas, one of three divine principles in Pherecydes of Syros's Pentemychos cosmogony
