= Saz =

Saz or SAZ may refer to:

== People ==
- Alberto del Saz
- Ismael Saz, Spanish historian
- Juan Alvarado y del Saz
- Leyla Saz (1850–1936), Turkish composer, poet and writer
- SAZ, or Sameh Zakout, Palestinian rap artist

== Places ==
- Saz, Iran, a village in Kermanshah Province, Iran
- Saz, Kaynaşlı

== Other ==
- Saz style, a serrated leaf pattern used in Ottoman art and pottery
- Saurashtra language (ISO 639-3: saz)
- Sozialistische Arbeiter-Zeitung (SAZ), newspaper published in Germany
- Saz or bağlama, family of musical instruments

== See also ==
- Saaz (disambiguation)
