= Busted by the Feds =

Busted By The Feds: A Manual For Defendants Facing Federal Prosecution
- Author: Larry Fassler
- Language: English
- Publication date: 2006

Busted By The Feds: A Manual For Defendants Facing Federal Prosecution, by Larry Fassler, is a 2006 book on the U.S. federal justice system, intended as a manual for defendants facing charges. Fassler claims he wrote the book after "two years working with inmates at the federal prison in Phoenix, Arizona helping with appeals and post-conviction motions." In 2008, Fassler himself was accused by federal authorities of participating in a drug ring that moved large shipments of cannabis from Arizona to Northeast Ohio. Fassler died while incarcerated at Fort Worth FCI.

Busted by the Feds is not to be confused with Agent Steal's Everything a Hacker Needs to Know About Getting Busted by the Feds, a document intended to help computer hackers understand the legal system.
