= Saas =

Saas, SAAS, or SaaS may refer to:

== Places in Switzerland ==
- Saas im Prättigau, in the Canton of Graubünden
  - Saas railway station
- Saastal or the Saas Valley, in the Canton of Valais
- Villages in the Saas Valley
  - Saas-Almagell
  - Saas-Balen
  - Saas-Fee
  - Saas-Grund

== Other uses ==
- Seattle Academy of Arts and Sciences, U.S.
- Société Anonyme des Ateliers de Sécheron, a Swiss manufacturing company
- Social Accountability Accreditation Services, accreditors of the SA8000 certification standard
- Software as a service (SaaS), a cloud computing service model
- SA Ambulance Service, in South Australia
- Sports Association for Adelaide Schools, in South Australia
- Student Awards Agency for Scotland
- Singapore Association for the Advancement of Science at Singapore National Academy of Science

== See also ==
- SAA (disambiguation)
- Saaz (disambiguation)
- Sass (disambiguation)
- SSAS (disambiguation)
- SAS (disambiguation)
- Security as a service (SECaaS, SaaS)
