= Lateral collateral ligament of ankle joint =

Ligaments of the ankle

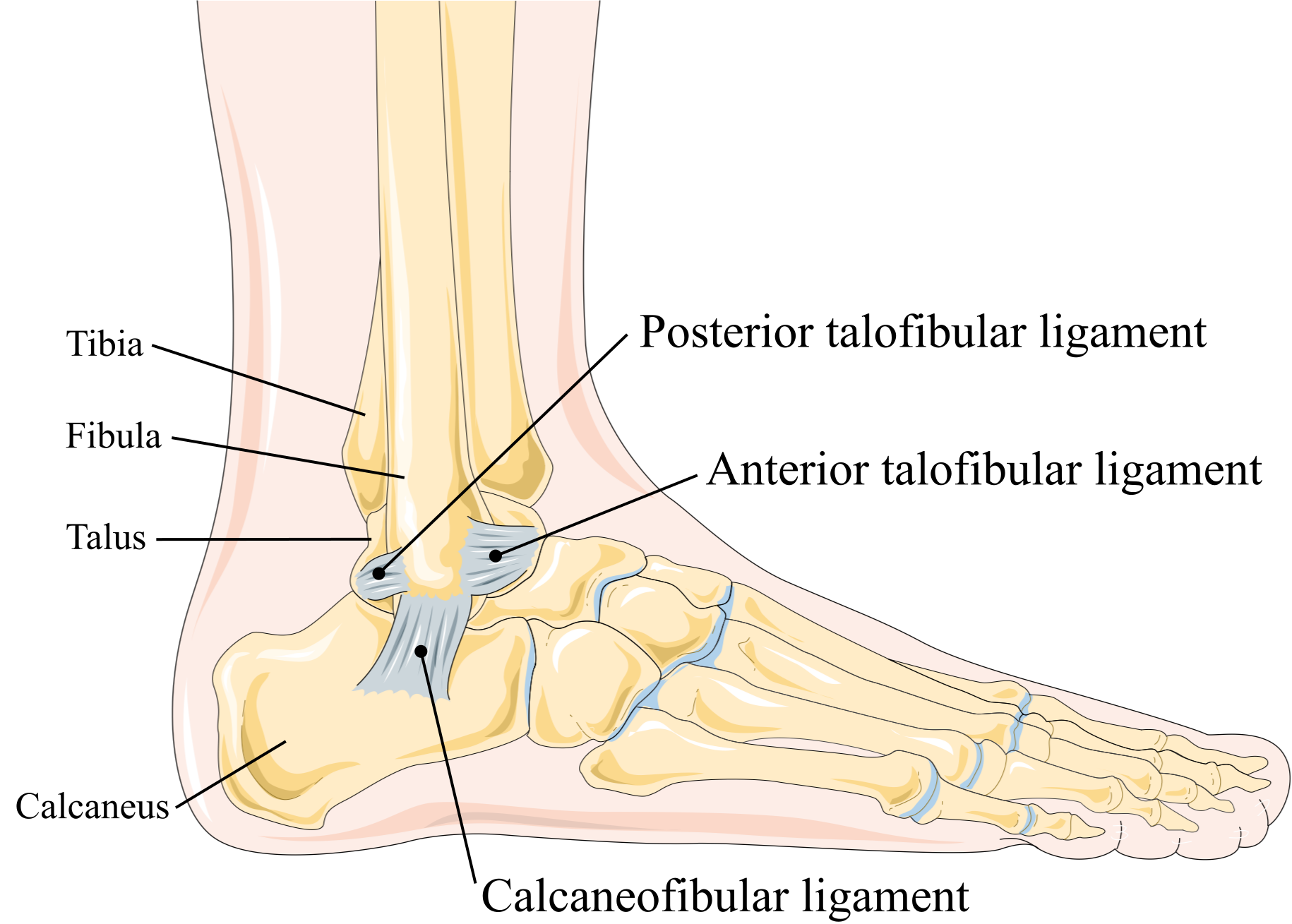
- Right foot, lateral side. Three ligaments which compose the lateral collateral ligament are depicted.
- Dissection video (1 min 10 s)

Details
- From: talus bone, calcaneus
- To: fibula (lateral malleolus)

Identifiers
- Latin: ligamentum collaterale laterale articulationis talocruralis
- MeSH: D017844
- TA98: A03.6.10.008
- TA2: 1918
- FMA: 44076

The lateral collateral ligament of ankle joint (or external lateral ligament of the ankle-joint) is a ligament complex of the ankle collectively composed of three ligaments attached to the fibula:

1. anterior talofibular ligament
2. posterior talofibular ligament
3. calcaneofibular ligament.

Together, these liaments attach to the talus, talus, and calcaneus bones respectively, and help stabilize the lateral ankle.

The anterior talofibular ligament is the most common ligament involved in an ankle sprain, and the weakest of the lateral collateral complex.

== Structure ==
Its components are:

- anterior talofibular ligament

The anterior talofibular ligament attaches the anterior margin of the lateral malleolus to the adjacent region of the talus bone. The most common ligament involved in an ankle sprain is the anterior talofibular ligament.

- posterior talofibular ligament

The posterior talofibular ligament runs horizontally between the neck of the talus and the medial side of lateral malleolus

- calcaneofibular ligament

The calcaneofibular ligament is attached on the posteromedial side of lateral malleolus and descends posteroinferiorly below to a lateral side of the calcaneus.

== See also ==
- Sprained ankle
