= Calcaneofibular ligament =

Ligament in the human foot

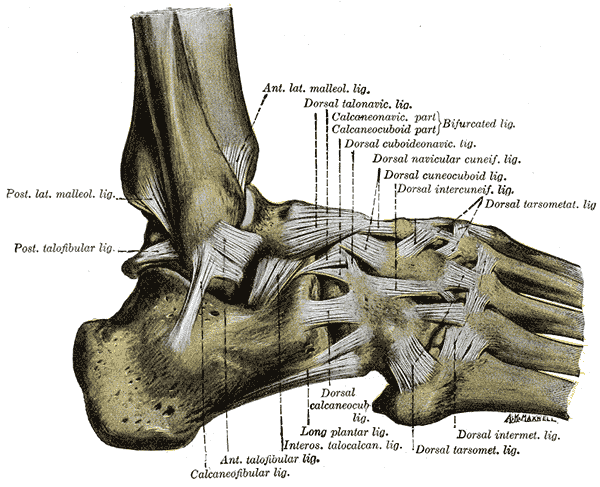
- The ligaments of the foot from the lateral aspect. (Label for Calcaneofibular ligament is at bottom left.)

- Lateral view of the human ankle

Details
- From: calcaneus
- To: fibula (lateral malleolus)

Identifiers
- Latin: ligamentum calcaneofibulare
- TA98: A03.6.10.011
- TA2: 1921
- FMA: 44089

The calcaneofibular ligament is a narrow, rounded cord, running from the tip of the lateral malleolus of the fibula downward and slightly backward to a tubercle on the lateral surface of the calcaneus. It is part of the lateral collateral ligament, which opposes the hyperinversion of the subtalar joint, as in a common type of ankle sprain.

It is covered by the tendons of the fibularis longus and brevis muscles.

== Clinical significance ==
The calcaneofibular ligament is commonly sprained ligament in ankle injuries. It may be injured individually, or in combination with other ligaments such as the anterior talofibular ligament and the posterior talofibular ligament.
