= History of the SAS =

History of the SAS may refer to the following:

- History of the Special Air Service
- History of the Second Avenue Subway

== See also ==
- SAS (disambiguation)
