= Saaz =

Saaz may refer to:

- Saaz, the former German name of Žatec, a town in the Czech Republic
  - Saaz hops, a hop variety used in production of pilsener style beer
  - DSV Saaz, a former football club in Žatec
  - Johannes von Saaz (c. 1350 – c. 1415), "Jan from Žatec", Bohemian writer
- Saaz (film), a 1998 Indian film
- Saaz Complect (for "Skopinskiy Avtoagregatniy Zavod"), an automotive component factory in Skopin, Russia
- Saaz Aggarwal (born 1961) is a Pune-based Indian-English writer, biographer, oral historian, independent researcher, and artis

== See also ==
- Saas (disambiguation)
- Saz (disambiguation)
