= Malleolar sulcus =

Grooves between the ankle and leg bones

Diagram of tibia and fibula

The tibial malleolar sulcus, also known as the malleolar groove, is the smooth, vertical depression found on the posterior aspect of the medial malleolus. This groove is traversed by the tendons of the tibialis posterior and flexor digitorum longus muscles.

There are two malleolar sulci, medial and lateral. The medial malleolar sulcus is the posto-inferior groove just lateral to the medial malleolus on the distal part of the tibia. It is where the tendons of the tibialis posterior and flexor digitorum longus course on their way to their insertions on the foot. The lateral malleolar sulcus is the posto-inferior groove on the distal part of the fibula. The tendons of the peroneus longus and peroneus brevis course behind it on the way to their insertions on the foot.
