= Switched Access Service =

Pacific Bell network testing and monitoring system

Switched Access Services (SAS) was an internal Pacific Bell system used for network testing and maintenance by telephone company personnel. It allowed remote access for testing subscriber lines and facilities and gained notoriety in the 1980s–1990s for alleged unauthorized use in monitoring calls. It featured prominently in investigations and trials involving hackers Kevin Mitnick, Kevin Poulsen, and Justin Tanner Petersen (also known as "Eric Heinz" or "Agent Steal") during the 1990s.

== History ==
Mitnick learned of SAS in the early 1990s from Petersen, who had discovered references to the system while breaking into Pacific Bell facilities with Poulsen.

== Capabilities ==
According to Mitnick, SAS enabled technicians to check subscriber line status, initiate tests, and access switching facilities—and also allowed the user to instantly connect to any telephone line for undetected monitoring. Prosecutors described it as "test technology" hijacked for criminal purposes, including intercepting calls and making calls appear to originate from different numbers.

== In hacker culture ==
SAS was targeted by phone phreaks for its monitoring capabilities. Kevin Poulsen pleaded guilty to using it, including to rig radio station call-in contests. Petersen was accused (via his attorney) of using it while an FBI informant. Mitnick obtained documentation using social engineering techniques and described using it to monitor lines.

== Relationship to switched access service ==
The name also appears in Pacific Bell's public FCC tariffs for carrier access services, which appear distinct from the internal testing tool described by hackers.

== See also ==
- Pacific Bell
- Kevin Mitnick
- Kevin Poulsen
- Justin Tanner Petersen
- Phone phreaking
- Wiretapping
