= Zas (surname) =

Zas is a surname, and may refer to:

- Francisco Zas (born 1972), Spanish taekwondo practitioner
- Leolin Zas (born 1995), South African rugby union footballer
- Stanislav Zas (born 1964), Belarusian general and politician

== See also ==
- Zass
- Szász
