= Sass (surname) =

Sass or Saß is a surname which may refer to:

- A. J. Sass, American children's writer
- Anatoliy Sass (1935–2023), Russian rower
- Barbara Sass (1936–2015), Polish screenwriter and director
- Barbara Saß-Viehweger (born 1943), German politician
- Billy Sass-Davies (born 2000), Welsh footballer
- Brent Sass (born 1980), American dog musher
- Dawn Marie Sass (born 1959), American politician from Wisconsin
- Else Kai Sass (1912–1987), Danish art historian
- Evelyn Sass, married name Evelyn Handler (1933–2011), American academic administrator
- Friedrich Sass (1883–1968), German engineer and historian
- Hans-Martin Sass (1935–2023), German bioethicist
- Henry Sass (1788–1844), English painter and educator
- Johannes Sass (1889–1971), German linguist
- Julia Sass (died 1891), British missionary
- Katrin Sass (born 1956), German actress
- Katrina Von Sass (born 1972), Canadian volleyball player
- Kimberly Sass (born 1990), American ice hockey player
- Larry Sass (born 1964), American architect
- Lennart Sass (born 2000), German Paralympic judoka
- Lorna Sass, American cookery author
- Louis Sass, American psychologist
- Paul Sass (born 1988), English martial artist
- Pedro Sass (born 1990), Brazilian footballer
- Richard Sass (1774–1849), English painter, half-brother to Henry Sass
- Róbert Sass (born 1959), Hungarian rower
- Sylvia Sass (born 1951), Hungarian operatic soprano
- Theodor von Sass (1881–1958), German Lutheran pastor

== See also ==
- Sasse (surname)
- Zass
