= SASS-C =

Surveillance Analysis Support System for Air Traffic Control Centres

SASS-C VERIFication
- Developer: Eurocontrol
- Stable release: 25.10.1 / Oct 24, 2025
- Operating system: Linux
- Type: Air Traffic Management Surveillance sensor performance assessment and trajectory reconstruction (tracker)
- License: Eurocontrol Licence - Software available on request

SASS-C PREDICTion
- Developer: Eurocontrol
- Stable release: 25.04 / May 20, 2025
- Operating system: Linux
- Type: Theoretical calculation of surveillance infrastructure performance
- License: Eurocontrol Licence - Software available on request

SASS-C Logo

For air traffic control, SASS-C is an acronym for "Surveillance Analysis Support System for ATC-Centre". SASS-C Service is part of Eurocontrol Communications, navigation and surveillance.

== Introduction ==
SASS-C Service provides two main software suites:

- VERIFication: ATC surveillance infrastructure assessment.
- PREDICTion: performance theoretical calculation of the ATC surveillance sensors.

== VERIFication ==
=== Usage ===
There are two key functions of SASS-C VERIFication:

- evaluation of the actual performance of ATC sensors or infrastructure against different standard like Eurocontrol Specification for ATM Surveillance System Performance (ESASSP).
- incident investigation.

SASS-C VERIFication is designed to handle all current surveillance technologies (PSR, SSR, Mode-S, ADS-B, WAM) as well as trackers. Evolutions for handling drones, Multi Static Primary Surveillance (MSPSR) and Surface Movement Area-specific sensors are considered in the future.

=== Modules ===
SASS-C VERIFication is divided into many modules. The key ones are:

- IRIS: ATC surveillance data recording, decoding and statistics. In supports many framing or coding surveillance data format. One between many: ASTERIX.
- OTR (Opportunity Traffic Reconstructor): build a reference trajectory based on the ATC surveillance data generated by the opportunity traffic. This module is widely inspired by the real-time tracker technologies like Kalman filter. But it takes also advantage that it works off-line: the aircraft trajectories are known over the complete dataset time window.
- CMP (Comparator evaluation suite): it is the hearth of VERIFication. The CMP module compares the ATC surveillance data against reference that can be generated by OTR or imported from external source. It generates performance indicators (e.g. detection probability, accuracy) suitable for assessment against standards like ESASSP.
- REPORT: configurable reporting and trend analysis.
- DISPlay: this module displays ATC surveillance data, reconstructed data and performance indicators on different supports like geographical view, scatter diagram, table or mosaic.

=== History ===
Since the beginning of development in 1988 based on MURATREC (1985), the SASS-C software has been under constant evolution to cope with supplementary user requirements, to cover surveillance technology upgrades and to follow software technology changes.

Date	Version	Platform
1985	MURATREC	
November 2002	SASS-C 5.4	HP-UX 10.20
December 15, 2003	SASS-C 5.5	HP-UX 10.20, RHEL2.1/3.0
August 2004	SASS-C 6.2b	RHEL 2.1/3.0
August 9, 2005	SASS-C 6.3-P8	
September 30, 2005	SASS-C 6.3.1	
February 1, 2006	SASS-C 6.3.2	
May 2009	SASS-C 6.6	
July 2010	SASS-C 6.7	
October 17, 2013	VERIFication 7.A.1.1999	
October 28, 2014	VERIFication 8.0	Centos 5.5, MySQL 5.1.50; Centos 6.4, MySQL 5.1.66
November 15, 2018	VERIFication 8.1	Linux 7.3, MariaDB 5.5.52
November 8, 2019	VERIFication 8.2	Linux 7.3, MariaDB 5.5.52
November 9, 2020	VERIFication 8.4	Linux 7.3, MariaDB 5.5.52
June 18, 2021	VERIFication 21.2	Linux 7.3, MariaDB 5.5.52
November 12, 2021	VERIFication 21.3	Linux 7.3, MariaDB 5.5.52
April 6, 2022	VERIFication 22.1	Linux 7.9, MariaDB 5.5.68
June 13, 2022	VERIFication 22.2	Linux 7.9, MariaDB 5.5.68
October 4, 2022	VERIFication 22.3	Linux 7.9, MariaDB 5.5.68
April 25, 2023	VERIFication 23.04	Linux 7.9, MariaDB 5.5.68
November 6, 2023	VERIFication 23.10	Linux 7.9, MariaDB 5.5.68
April 29, 2024	VERIFication 24.04	Linux 7.9, MariaDB 5.5.68
November 6, 2024	VERIFication 24.10	Linux 7.9, MariaDB 5.5.68
May 5, 2025	VERIFication 25.04	Linux 9.5, MariaDB 10.5
October 24, 2025	VERIFication 25.10.1	Linux 9.5/6, MariaDB 10.5

==== SASS-C v6 ====
In version 6, both suites, VERIFication and PREDICTion, where included in a common package just named SASS-C.

This early version was supporting only PSR/SSR/Mode-S Radars and trackers.

==== VERIFication v7 ====
Since end of 2003 and in order to prepare SASS-C for the next decade, important software re-engineering has been undertaken in conjunction with functional upgrades, with the aim to introduce up to date technologies in all relevant fields while enhancing system quality. The main functional upgrades relate to the introduction of Aircraft Derived data (Mode S and ADS-B), and multilateration technology in the Surveillance environment.

It consists into four different independent suites:

- IRIS (IOSS Recording and Import into SCDB) is the front element of SASS-C handling Surveillance Data from various sensors. The functionality comprises decoding (one between many, ASTERIX data format), recording and computation of statistics.
- TRES (Trajectory Reconstruction and Evaluation Suite) is the core suite of SASS-C, carrying out the reconstruction of reference trajectories from the input data, and doing the evaluation of Surveillance constituent's performance.
- SMART (Simulator for Multi-radar Analysis from Realistic Traffic) is an upgrade of the present real-time simulator generating Surveillance data reports by sampling simulated aircraft trajectories.
- SCAS (Surveillance Coverage Analysis Suite) comprises RASCAL (RAdar Sharing CALculation) and CAPT (Coverage And Planning Tool for ADS-B and TIS-B), a new tool to aid in the positioning of ADS-B and TIS-B ground stations by assessing various communication load scenarios.

IRIS and TRES store the surveillance data in a common database.

==== VERIFication v8 and later ====
The version 8 is the result of another re-engineering for better performance and maximum openness.

The suite has been re-organised as described in Modules sections.

Since 2021, the version identification has changed to the format vYY.NN (e.g. v25.04) with YY, the two last digits of the year and NN, the month of the year, usually 04 for the spring version and 10 for the autumn one.

== PREDICTion ==
Taking different resolutions of Digital Terrain Elevation Data – DTED as input, PREDICTion computes the theoretical performance of ATC surveillance sensors like radars and ADS-B or WAM ground stations:

- target detection probability
- interference between sensors
- target position accuracy

The theoretical coverage is generated in two forms that can be used in other tools like SASS-C VERIFication:

- screening files: obstacle ranges and elevations per azimuth.
- surveillance map: minimum visible altitude per cell in horizontal plane.

=== History ===
Date	Version
January 2009	CAPT 1.0
March 17, 2015	PREDICTion 2.3
March 22, 2018	PREDICTion 2.3.1
October 25, 2019	PREDICTion 2.4
May 6, 2020	PREDICTion 2.4.1
December 2, 2020	PREDICTion 2.4.2
July 19, 2021	PREDICTion 21.1
November 17, 2022	PREDICTion 22.3
December 6, 2023	PREDICTion 23.10
May 20, 2025	PREDICTion 25.04
