= SAS (shoemakers) =

American shoe manufacturer

San Antonio Shoemakers
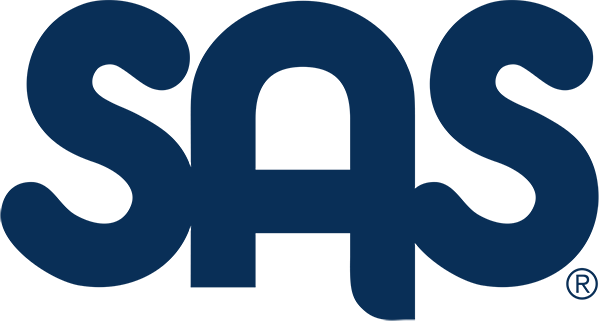
- Company type: Privately held company
- Industry: Shoes
- Predecessor: Bimbi Shoe Co.
- Founded: San Antonio, Texas, USA (1976)
- Founder: Terry Armstrong and Lew Hayden
- Headquarters: 1717 SAS Drive, San Antonio, Texas, USA 78224
- Key people: Nancy Richardson (CEO)
- Products: Shoes, Purses, socks, shoe care
- Website: www.sasshoes.com

San Antonio Shoemakers (SAS) is an American shoe manufacturer based in San Antonio, Texas. The company specializes in handcrafted men's and women's shoes. It is a family-owned company that makes its shoes in Texas. Some operations, such as hand stitching and hand lacing, are done in Acuna, Mexico, on a few select SAS handbag styles. The majority of shoe operations are conducted at two Texas-based factories in San Antonio and Del Rio.

== History ==
San Antonio Shoemakers was founded in 1976 by Terry Armstrong and Lew Hayden.

== Products and availability ==
SAS is best known for their hand-crafted shoe forms, in 88 ladies' sizes and 104 men's sizes, to provide a suitable fit. SAS shoes are sold at SAS branded retail locations across the United States and in 11 additional countries, as well as online. Their products are also available in numerous multi-line shoe stores. SAS's primary competitors in the comfort shoe market are: Bostonian, Clarks, ECCO, and New Balance.

The SAS Shoe Factory and General Store, located on the South Side of San Antonio near the intersection of SW Military Drive and S. Zarzamora Street, offers a factory tour.

== Philanthropy ==
SAS has been known to give back to the community in times of need. A team of volunteers from SAS, their "Comfort and Support Team" visit disaster areas to fit victims with free shoes when they are in need.

According to the SAS website, the Comfort and Support Team has donated over 14,000 pairs of shoes so far, along with other necessities, to victims of natural disasters.
