= High ankle sprain =

- Other names: Syndesmotic ankle sprain, syndesmotic ankle injury
- Specialty: Orthopedics

A high ankle sprain, also known as a syndesmotic ankle sprain (SAS), is a sprain of the syndesmotic ligaments that connect the tibia and fibula in the lower leg, thereby creating a mortise and tenon joint for the ankle. High ankle sprains are described as high because they are located above the ankle. They comprise approximately 15% of all ankle sprains. Unlike the common lateral ankle sprains, when ligaments around the ankle are injured through an inward twisting, high ankle sprains are caused when the lower leg and foot externally rotates (twists out).

== Mechanism ==
The ankle joint consists of the talus resting within the mortise created by the tibia and fibula as previously described. Since the talus is wider anteriorly (in the front) than posteriorly (at the back), as the front of the foot is raised (dorsiflexed) reducing the angle between the foot and lower leg to less than 90°, then the mortise is confronted with an increasingly wider talus. The force is heightened when the foot is simultaneously forced into external rotation (turned outward). This chain of events may occur when the front of a hockey player's skate strikes the boards and the foot is forced outward. It may also occur in football, for example, when a player is on the ground with their leg behind them, the foot at right angles, and a rotational force is suddenly applied to the heel, as when someone falls on their foot. Overall, the most common mechanism is external rotation and may occur with sufficient rapidity that the actual mechanism is unrecognized.

In this sequence of events, the most vulnerable structure is the anterior inferior tibio-fibular ligament, uniting the lower end of the tibia and fibula and playing an important role in the maintenance of the mortise. The injury to this ligament may vary from simple stretch to complete rupture. Some restraint to further injury is offered by the structures on the inside of the ankle, the medial malleolus and the medial collateral ligament. However, should these structures fail, then the force will be transmitted beyond the anterior inferior tibiofibular ligament to the strong membrane that holds the tibia and fibula together for most of their length. This force may then exit through the upper end of the fibula, creating a so-called Maisonneuve fracture.

== Diagnosis ==
Those who sustain high ankle sprains usually present with pain in the outside-front of the leg above the ankle, with increased discomfort when twisting (external rotation) is applied. In some cases, the diagnosis is only made after treatment for the more common, lateral, ankle sprain fails. Diagnosis may also be delayed because swelling is usually minor or nonexistent and the true nature of the injury unappreciated. A variety of diagnostic tests have been described such as the 'squeeze' (compressing the tibia and fibula above the midpoint of the calf), 'dorsiflexion with compression' (patient dorsiflexes the foot while the examiner compresses the internal and external malleolus), and 'external rotation' (patient sits with leg dangling and ankle at 90° and external rotation then applied to the foot) etc. None of them performs sufficiently well to allow diagnosis to be made on the basis of a single test, and is usually made by combining multiple tests supplemented with appropriate imaging when indicated. Plain radiographs, Ultrasound or MRI may be used for diagnosis.

In the case of X-rays, demonstration of widening of the tibia and fibula 'mortise', a fracture of the medial malleolus, or a Maisonneuve fracture, will indicate an unstable or potentially unstable injury. However, 'normal' x-rays do not exclude significant ligament injury, and in one study, the ratio of diagnostic X-ray to known syndesmotic injury was only one in 17. By contrast, ultrasound may permit the injury to be visualized while the mortise is being stressed. Consequently, a diagnostic modality such as ultrasound or magnetic resonance imaging (MRI) that demonstrates the ligament itself may be helpful, if clinical suspicion remains.

== Treatment ==
Treatment depends on severity and convalescence may be as short as a few days or as long as six months. Rest, icing, compression, and elevation is often recommended.

Two important issues should be addressed early. First, a determination of whether the ankle is stable or unstable. This is usually answered by clinical assessment together with results of the imaging modalities previously described. In the case of suspected instability, specialist referral is indicated as surgery and some form of internal fixation may be an option, if not a requirement. Second, a decision of degree of weight bearing, if any, to be permitted. The answer to this is partly related to stability, partly to the clinical estimate of ligament injury together with imaging findings, and partly related to discomfort when weight bearing. The final decision is largely individualized depending on the circumstances.

An alternative measure consists of H.E.M. (Healthy blood flow, Eliminate swelling and Mobility). This treatment suggests increasing healthy blood flow to the ankle, including immune cells required for healing. The treatment also suggests improving healthy range of motion, stability and strength in the ankle to aid in a full recovery. Recent research suggests that macrophages (immune cells responsible for muscle repair and growth) are necessary for muscle to grow back to its pre-injured state. The H.E.M. ankle rehab treatment suggests not icing the injury, and instead, following more proactive rehab techniques for recovery: "when ice is applied to a body part for a prolonged period, nearby lymphatic vessels begin to dramatically increase their permeability (lymphatic vessels are 'dead-end' tubes which ordinarily help carry excess tissue fluids back into the cardiovascular system). As lymphatic permeability is enhanced, large amounts of fluid begin to pour from the lymphatics 'in the wrong direction' (into the injured area), increasing the amount of local swelling and pressure and potentially contributing to greater pain."

Rehabilitation is important. A significant percentage of these sprains also involve medial and/or lateral ankle ligament injury and slow recovery and continuing symptoms are common. However, limiting external rotation to protect healing ligaments is a primary concern and can usually be achieved by short leg casts, walking boots, and custom orthoses. The degree of permitted weight bearing can be individualized dependent on tolerance and those with less injury are able to ambulate with full weight-bearing. Nevertheless, most use crutches to reduce the burden to some extent and those with more discomfort may be limited to "toe touch" on the affected side for one to two weeks. Some advocate the ability to climb and descend stairs with minimal discomfort as an indication to permit full, or at least progressive, weight-bearing. Early resistance exercise minimizes muscle atrophy and weakness and a variety of exercises—elastic bands, ankle weights, heel raise exercises—may be used in conjunction with a calf stretch. In the early stages, isometric strengthening and electrical stimulation will combat muscle atrophy and developing weakness.

== See also ==
- Sprained ankle
