= Sassy Ross =

American poet

- Born: Castries, St. Lucia
- Education: MFA in poetry
- Alma mater: Studied at Pennsylvania State University, obtained her MFA from New York University
- Occupation: Poet
- Writing career
- Genres: Poetry, Creative Writing
- Subject: Caribbean Literature

Sassy Ross is a poet. Born in Saint Lucia, she lives in New York City.

== Early life ==
Ross was born in Castries, Saint Lucia. She lived her early years in the Caribbean and grew up speaking a mixture of English and French patois. When she was ten years old she moved to the United States, arriving in Virginia. She attended Pennsylvania State University and began writing poetry. She moved to New York and received her Master of Fine Arts degree in poetry from New York University (NYU).

== Career ==
While studying poetry at NYU, Ross was nominated for a Ruth Lilly Poetry Fellowship. She later taught Creative Writing at NYU, and also taught high school English at the Student Center program in New Orleans, where she was a member of the Nommo Literary Workshop. She also served as the managing editor of Calabash, a NYU publication.

Her work has appeared in Prairie Schooner, Caribbean Beat, the Caribbean Review of Books, Calabash: A Journal of Caribbean Arts and Letters, Poetry International, Kalliope, online journals such as Mélange and Timbooktu, and Coming Up Hot, an anthology of Caribbean poets. She received second place in the Katey Lehman Creative Writing contest.

== Work ==
Sassy Ross's poems focus on a nostalgia for the past, the geography, and the languages and voices she left behind in the Caribbean. Her poems recall the landscapes of St. Lucia, and explore the central themes of home in relation to her departure, and return, also examining her relationships with her parents, displacement, language, conflict, and trauma, both from the perils of the island and her past.
