= Saz, Iran =

Saz ساز
- Village
- Location within Iran
- Coordinates: 34°37′38″N 47°08′52″E
- Country: Iran
- Province: Kermanshah
- County: Kermanshah
- Bakhsh: Central
- Rural District: Poshtdarband

Population (2006)
  - Total: 206
- Time zone: UTC+3:30 (IRST)
  - Summer (DST): UTC+4:30 (IRDT)

Saz (Persian: ساز, also Romanized as Sāz; also known as Sahāz) is a village in Poshtdarband Rural District, in the Central District of Kermanshah County, Kermanshah Province, Iran. At the 2006 census, its population was 206, in 44 families.
