= My Sassy Girl (disambiguation) =

My Sassy Girl is a 2001 South Korean romantic comedy film.

My Sassy Girl may also refer to:

- My Sassy Girl (2008 film), a 2008 American remake of the 2001 South Korean romantic-comedy My Sassy Girl
- My New Sassy Girl, a 2016 South Korean-Chinese sequel of the 2001 South Korean romantic-comedy My Sassy Girl
- My Sassy Girl (TV series), a 2017 South Korean television drama
- My Sassy Girl 2, a 2010 Chinese remake of the 2001 film

== See also ==
- Ugly Aur Pagli, a 2008 Indian remake of the 2001 film
