= SSAS =

SSAS may refer to:

- Ship Security Alert System
- Small Self Administered Scheme, a type of occupational trust-based pension scheme in the UK
- Solid State Ammonia Synthesis
- SQL Server Analysis Services
- SSAS, a class of the Order of the Star of South Africa
