= Sasse (surname) =

Sasse is a surname. Notable people with the surname include:

- Angela Sasse, German commputer scientist and information security expert
- Antoinette Sasse (1897–1986), French painter
- Arthur Sasse (1899–1991), American photographer
- Ben Sasse (born 1972), American academic administrator and politician from Nebraska
- Gwendolyn Sasse (born 1972), German political scientist
- Hans-Dietrich Sasse (born 1940), German field hockey player
- Hans-Jürgen Sasse (1943–2015), German linguist
- Hermann Sasse (1895–1976), German theologian
- Hugo Sasse (born 2004), German racing driver
- Jörg Sasse (born 1962), German photographer
- Joshua Sasse (born 1987), British actor
- Karl-Ernst Sasse (1923–2006), German composer
- Konrad Sasse (1926–1981), German musicologist
- Marie Sasse (1834–1907), Belgian operatic soprano
- Ralph Sasse (1889–1954), American soldier, football player and coach
- Reinhart Sasse (born 1943), German field hockey player
- Yan Sasse (born 1997), Brazilian footballer

== See also ==
- Sass (surname)
