= Sasse =

Sasse may refer to:

- Sasse (surname), including a list of people with the name
- Sasse (musician), Finnish electronic music producer Klas Lindblad
- Sasse Lake, Elysian Township, Le Sueur County, Minnesota, U.S.
- Student Association at the Stockholm School of Economics, in Sweden
