= Small Astronomy Satellite =

Small Astronomy Satellite may refer to:

- Uhuru (satellite), or Small Astronomy Satellite A (SAS-A) or SAS 1, launched 1970
- Small Astronomy Satellite 2, or SAS B or SAS 2, launched 1972
- Small Astronomy Satellite 3, or SAS C or SAS 3, launched 1975
