= Zass =

Zass is a surname. Notable people with the surname include:

- Alexander Zass (1888–1962), Russian strongman, wrestler, and animal trainer
- Grigory Zass (1797–1883), Russian general
