= Justin Tanner Petersen =

American hacker and informant (1960–2010)

- Born: July 28, 1960; Washington, D.C.
- Died: March 13, 2010 (aged 49); Los Angeles, California
- Occupations: Hacker, concert promoter, sound engineer and private investigator
- Years active: 1978–2010

Justin Tanner Petersen (July 28, 1960 – March 13, 2010), also known as Eric Heinz, was an American hacker, concert promoter, sound engineer, private investigator, and FBI informant. Operating under the handle Agent Steal, he committed a series of computer intrusions and fraud schemes beginning in the late 1970s. While serving as an FBI informant tasked with helping to catch other hackers, he continued to commit serious crimes, including wire fraud and identity theft.

== Life ==
Justin Petersen was born on July 28, 1960, in Washington, D.C., and began hacking computers in 1978. In 1984, he moved to Los Angeles, where he became involved in the Sunset Strip nightlife scene.

In 1989, Petersen—using the handle Agent Steal and the alias Eric Heinz, which he had assumed after leaving the East Coast—cracked the computers of Pacific Bell Telephone Company in California and used his access to intercept the telephone lines of several local FM radio stations. With this access, he and associates were able to ensure that they were the only callers who could get through during on-air contests, and thus the only winners. Although the associates remain officially unknown, strong rumors persist that Kevin Poulsen (aka Dark Dante) and Ronald Austin were involved. Their winnings included $50,000 in cash, several trips to Hawaii, and two Porsches. Petersen subsequently moved to Texas, where he hacked into a national credit reporting agency, obtained fraudulent credit cards using the information he found, and used them freely.

Petersen was arrested in Texas in 1991 following a tip to authorities. In an FBI affidavit, Petersen admitted to physically and electronically conducting illegal telephone taps and breaking into Pacific Bell's COSMOS system and other companies' computer systems to check telephone numbers and determine the location of telephone lines and circuits. A grand jury in Texas returned an eight-count indictment, accusing Petersen of assuming false identities, accessing a computer without authorization, possessing stolen account IDs, and fraudulently obtaining and using credit cards. Petersen also faced a charge related to his alleged compilation of U.S. federal government wiretap records on persons under active surveillance; this charge was dropped under a plea bargain following a debriefing by law enforcement, according to Littman.

The case was ultimately transferred to California, where Petersen pleaded guilty to six counts, including the rigging of a radio station contest to win a $20,000 prize. He faced a sentence of up to 40 years in prison and a $1.5 million fine, but sentencing was delayed several times as Petersen agreed to serve as an FBI informant for nearly two years. He stated that the FBI paid him a monthly stipend and provided free rent, computers, and other resources to assist in setting up other hackers, including Kevin Mitnick (aka Condor) and Kevin Poulsen (aka Dark Dante).

On October 18, 1993, fifteen months after entering his first guilty plea, Petersen was confronted inside a federal courthouse by David J. Schindler, the Assistant U.S. Attorney for the prosecution (who later became a private attorney for the Church of Scientology), who asked whether Petersen had committed any crimes while free on bail. Petersen requested a conference with his attorney, then fled the courthouse, becoming a fugitive a second time. Attorney Richard Sherman, who represented a friend of Kevin Mitnick's in a separate computer crime case, accused the FBI of not only using Petersen as an informant but of turning a blind eye to computer and credit card crimes Petersen allegedly committed during the period of his cooperation.

Petersen also claimed the FBI subsequently refused to allow him to work with or on computers. Given physical limitations stemming from a 1985 accident and the legal restrictions imposed on him, Petersen maintained he had little choice but to return briefly to hacking because he could not find legitimate employment.

While still a fugitive, Petersen allegedly hacked into the computers of Heller Financial, a commercial lending company. An unnamed associate phoned in two bomb threats to the institution, and while the building was being evacuated, Petersen allegedly initiated a wire transfer of $150,000 from Heller Financial to Union Bank by way of Mellon Bank. The transfer was discovered before the associate could withdraw the funds.

In November 1995, Petersen was sentenced to 41 months in U.S. federal prison and three years of probation, and ordered to pay $40,000 in restitution.

== Scientology ==
Author Jonathan Littman, in The Fugitive Game: Online with Kevin Mitnick, linked Petersen's sealed Texas court case with the Church of Scientology through a Beverly Hills private investigator named Shlomi Michaels and former FBI Special Agent in Charge Ted Gunderson. The firm Petersen worked for allegedly contracted him to eavesdrop on the Aznarans—high-ranking ex-Scientologists living in Texas who were cooperating with journalist Richard Behar in the writing of the highly critical 1991 Time magazine cover story on the church. Vicki and Richard Aznaran had left the Church of Scientology under circumstances they described as involving duress, and subsequently filed a complaint against Scientology alleging false imprisonment, intentional infliction of emotional distress, and other tortious conduct.

== Death ==
Petersen was found dead in his Los Angeles apartment on March 13, 2010. The Los Angeles County Medical Examiner listed his cause of death as "multiple drug intoxication."

== Bibliography ==
The following books reference Petersen:

- Adams, James (2001). The Next World War: Computers Are the Weapons and the Front Line Is Everywhere. Simon and Schuster. pp. 156–157. ISBN 978-0-7432-2380-5.
- Amoroso, Edward G. (1999). Intrusion Detection. Intrusion.Net Books. p. 218. ISBN 978-0-9666700-7-3.
- Barrett, Neil (2006). The Binary Revolution. Weidenfeld & Nicolson. p. 304. ISBN 978-0-297-84738-0.
- Clark III, Champ; Larry Chaffin; Anton Chuvakin; Seth Fogie; Craig Schiller; Scott Paladino; Colby DeRodeff; Dan Dunkel; Michael Gregg (2007). Infosecurity 2008 Threat Analysis. Elsevier. p. 480. ISBN 978-1-59749-224-9.
- Corley, Eric, ed. (2010). Dear Hacker: Letters to the Editor of 2600. Wiley. p. 8. ISBN 978-0-470-62006-9.
- Edgar, Stacey L. (2003). Morality and Machines. Jones & Bartlett Learning. pp. 522. ISBN 978-0-7637-1767-4.
- Gissel, Richard (2005). Digital Underworld: Computer Crime and Resulting Issues. MacroTech Press. p. 113. ISBN 978-1-4116-4423-6.
- Grabosky, Peter N.; Russell G. Smith; Gillian Dempsey (2001). Electronic Theft: Unlawful Acquisition in Cyberspace. Cambridge University Press. p. 39. ISBN 978-0-521-80597-1.
- Gregg, Michael; Stephen Watkins (2006). Hack the Stack: Using Snort and Ethereal to Master the 8 Layers of an Insecure Network. Syngress. p. 369. ISBN 978-1-59749-109-9.
- Hafner, Katie; John Markoff (1995). Cyberpunk: Outlaws and Hackers on the Computer Frontier. Simon and Schuster. p. 353. ISBN 978-0-684-81862-7.
- Knittel, John; Ryan P. Randolph; Michael Soto (2002). Everything You Need to Know about the Dangers of Computer Hacking. The Rosen Publishing Group. ISBN 978-0-8239-3764-6.
- Littman, Jonathan (1997). The Fugitive Game. Little, Brown. p. 416. ISBN 978-0-316-52869-6.
- Mitnick, Kevin; William L. Simon (2011). Ghost in the Wires. ISBN 978-0-316-03770-9.
- Mizell, Louis R. (1996). Masters of Deception. p. 253. ISBN 978-0-471-13355-1.
- Richards, James R. (1998). Transnational Criminal Organizations, Cybercrime, and Money Laundering. CRC Press. pp. 70–71. ISBN 978-0-8493-2806-0.
- Shimomura, Tsutomu; John Markoff (1996). Takedown. pp. 528. ISBN 978-0-7868-8913-6.
- Taylor, Paul A. (1999). Hackers: Crime in the Digital Sublime. Routledge. p. 3. ISBN 978-0-415-18072-6.
- Thomas, Douglas (2003). Hacker Culture. University of Minnesota Press. p. 185. ISBN 978-0-8166-3346-3.
- Anonymous (1997). Maximum Security. Sams Publishing. p. 885. ISBN 978-1-57521-268-5.
