= Malleolus =

Ankle bone protrusion

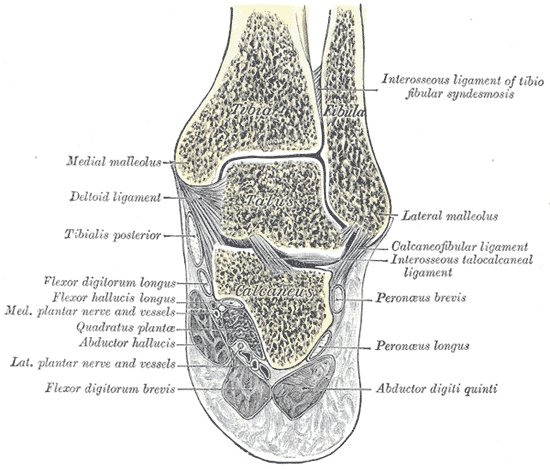
- Coronal cross-section through the right ankle showing the lateral malleolus (right) and medial malleolus (left)

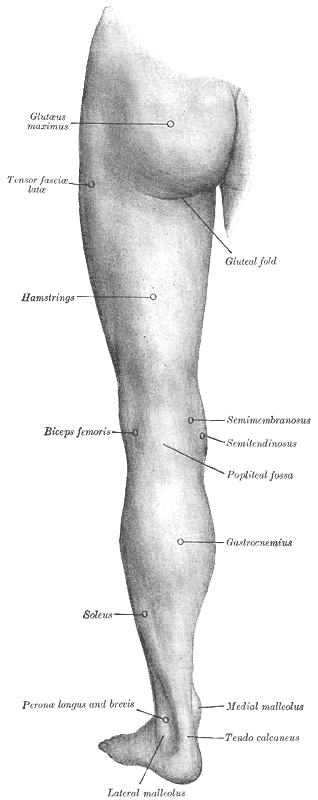
- The left leg, with the medial malleolus labeled at bottom right.

Details

Identifiers
- Latin: malleolus
- TA98: A02.5.07.014
- TA2: 1442
- FMA: 35502

A malleolus is the bony prominence on each side of the human ankle.

Each leg is supported by two bones, the tibia on the inner side (medial) of the leg and the fibula on the outer side (lateral) of the leg. The medial malleolus is the prominence on the inner side of the ankle, formed by the lower end of the tibia. The lateral malleolus is the prominence on the outer side of the ankle, formed by the lower end of the fibula.

The word malleolus (/məˈliːələs, mæ-/), plural malleoli (/məˈliːəˌlaɪ, mæ-/), comes from Latin and means "small hammer". (It is cognate with mallet.)

== Medial malleolus ==
The medial malleolus is found at the foot end of the tibia. The medial surface of the lower extremity of tibia is prolonged downward to form a strong pyramidal process, flattened from without inward - the medial malleolus.

- The medial surface of this process is convex and subcutaneous.
- The lateral or articular surface is smooth and slightly concave, and articulates with the talus.
- The anterior border is rough, for the attachment of the anterior fibers of the deltoid ligament of the ankle-joint.
- The posterior border presents a broad groove, the malleolar sulcus, directed obliquely downward and medially, and occasionally double; this sulcus lodges the tendons of the tibialis posterior and flexor digitorum longus.
- The summit of the medial malleolus is marked by a rough depression behind, for the attachment of the deltoid ligament.

The major structure that passes anterior to the medial malleolus is the saphenous vein.

Structures that pass behind medial malleolus deep to the flexor retinaculum:

- Tibialis posterior tendon
- Flexor digitorum longus
- Posterior tibial artery
- Posterior tibial vein
- Tibial nerve
- Flexor hallucis longus

== Lateral malleolus ==
The lateral malleolus is found at the foot end of the fibula, of a pyramidal form, and somewhat flattened from side to side; it descends to a lower level than the medial malleolus.

- The medial surface presents in front a smooth triangular surface, convex from above downward, which articulates with a corresponding surface on the lateral side of the talus. Behind and beneath the articular surface is a rough depression, which gives attachment to the posterior talofibular ligament.
- The lateral surface is convex, subcutaneous, and continuous with the triangular, subcutaneous surface on the lateral side of the body.
- The anterior border is thick and rough and marked below by a depression for the attachment of the anterior talofibular ligament.
- The posterior border is broad and presents the shallow malleolar sulcus, for the passage of the tendons of the peronæi longus and brevis.
- The summit is rounded and gives attachment to the calcaneofibular ligament.

A major structure that is located between the lateral malleolus and the Achilles tendon is the sural nerve.

== Clinical significance ==
=== Fracture ===
A bimalleolar fracture is a fracture of the ankle that involves the lateral malleolus and the medial malleolus. Studies have shown that bimalleolar fractures are more common in women, people over 60 years of age, and patients with existing comorbidities.

A trimalleolar fracture is a fracture of the ankle that involves the lateral malleolus, the medial malleolus, and the distal posterior aspect of the tibia, which can be termed the posterior malleolus. The trauma is sometimes accompanied by ligament damage and dislocation.

== Additional images ==
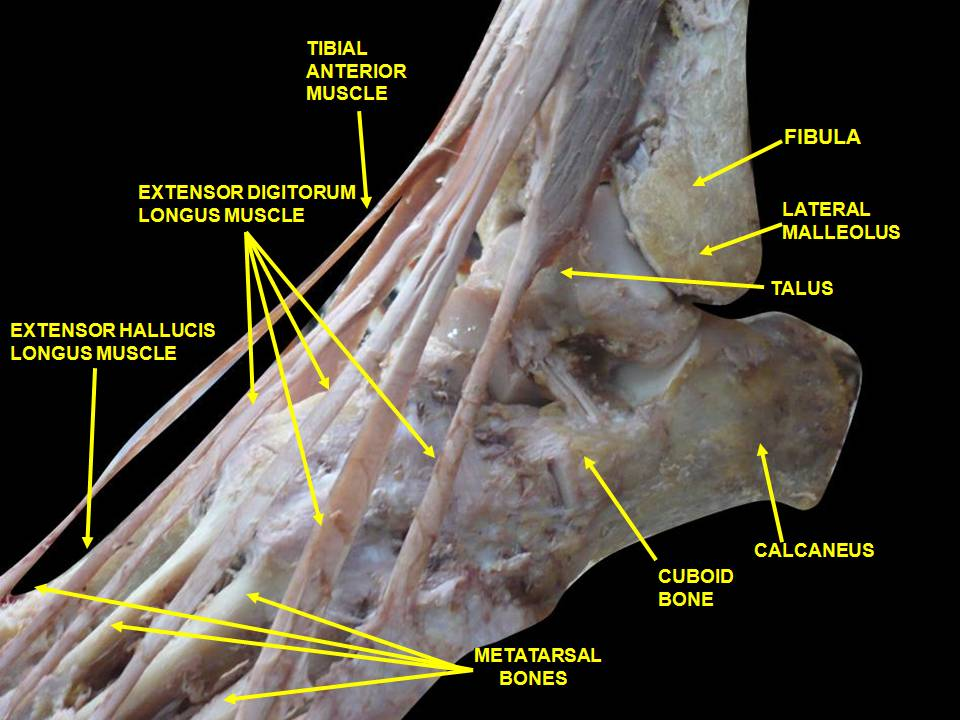
Ankle joint. Deep dissection. Lateral view.

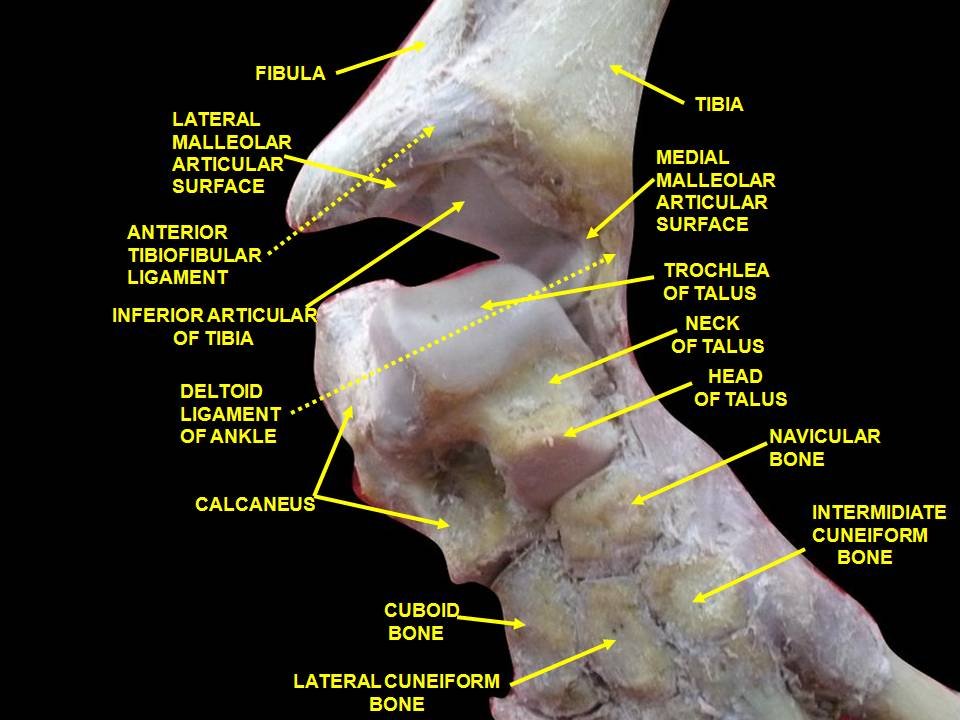
Ankle joint. Deep dissection.

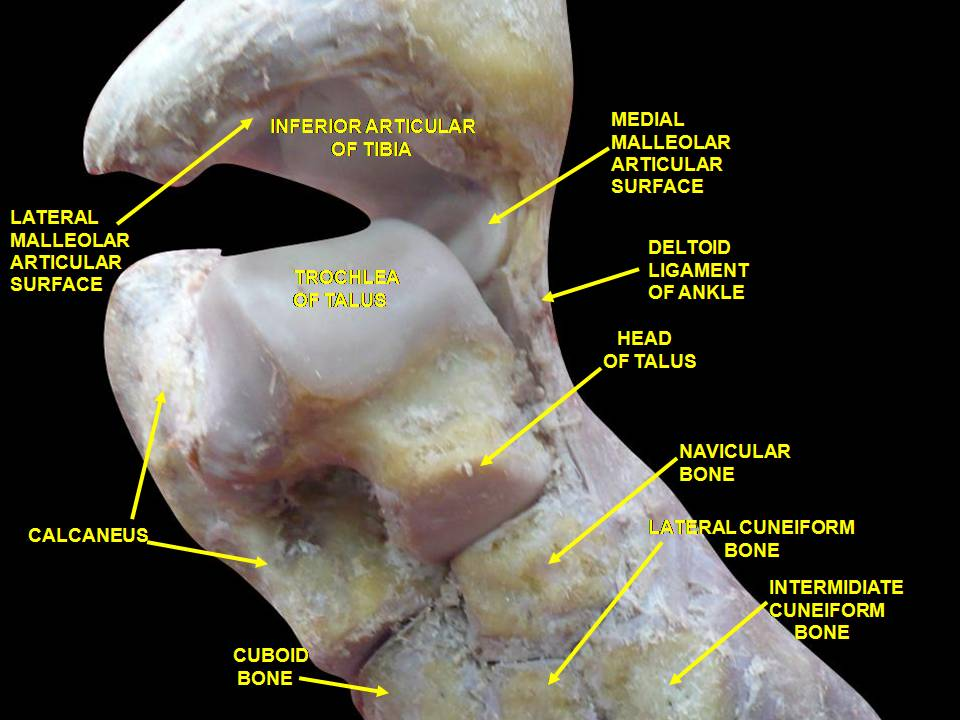
Ankle joint. Deep dissection.

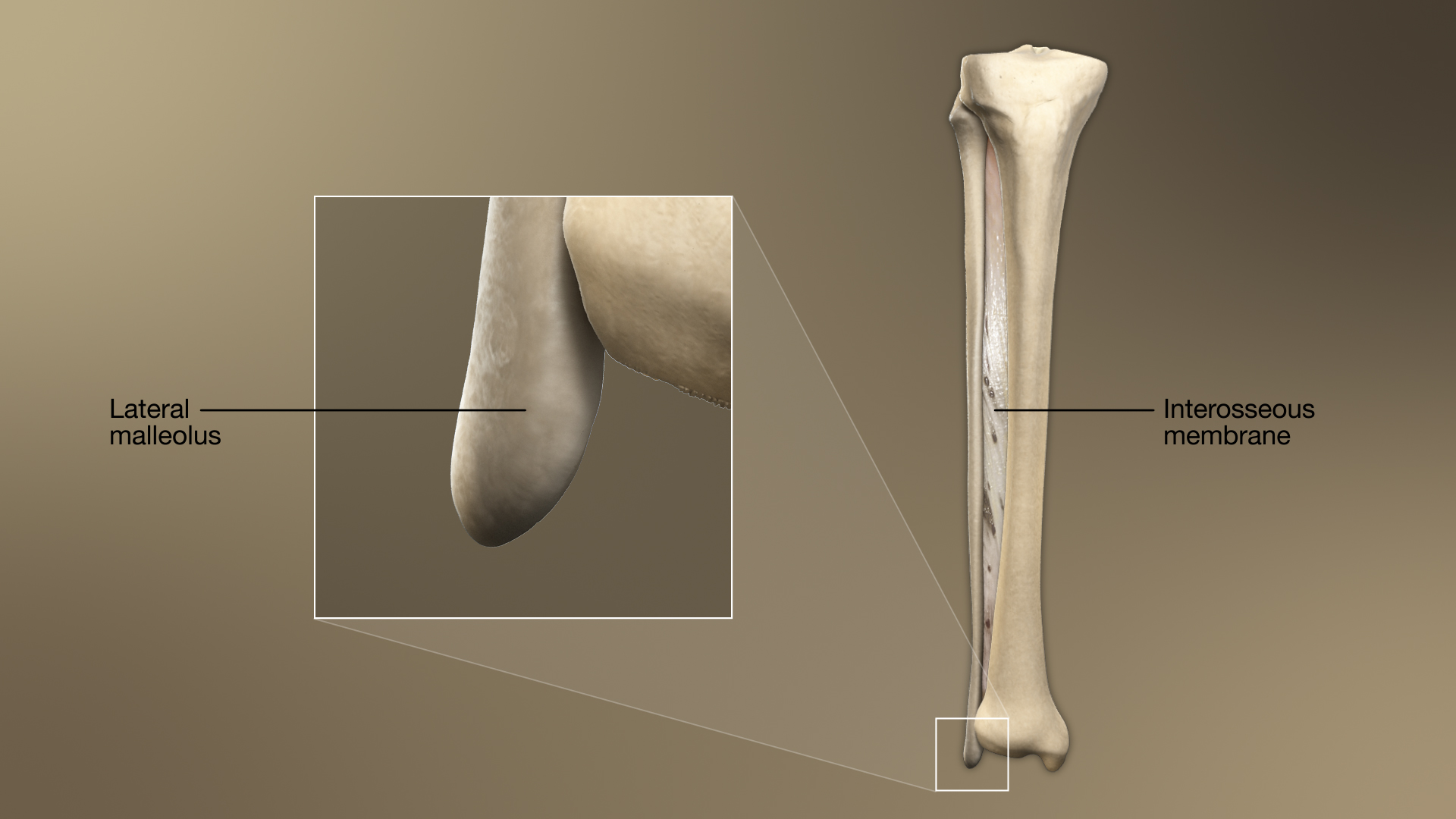
Image showing the lateral malleolus as part of the fibula.

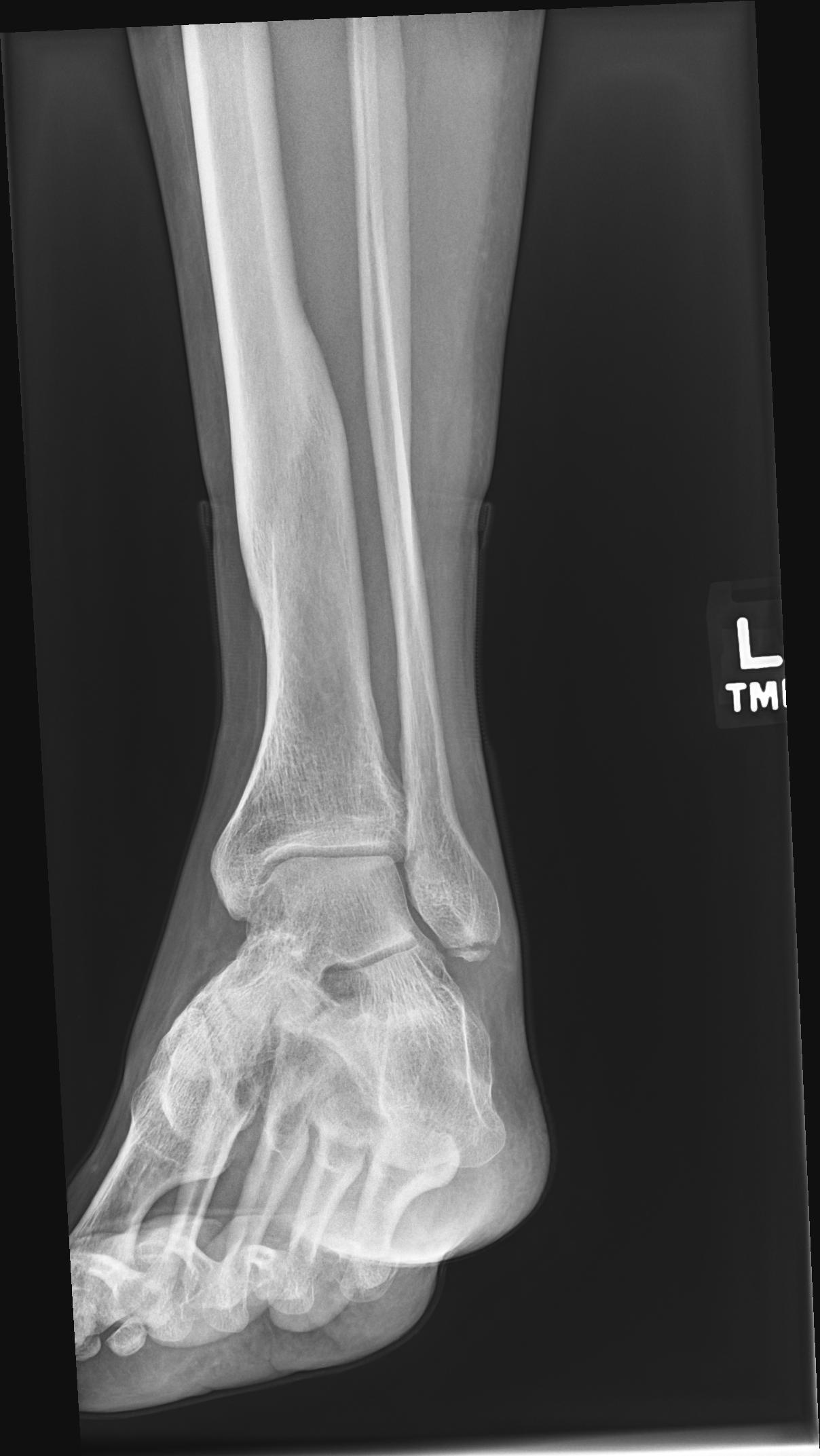
X-ray avulsion fracture of the summit of the left lateral malleolus.
