= Anterior talofibular ligament =

Ligament in the ankle

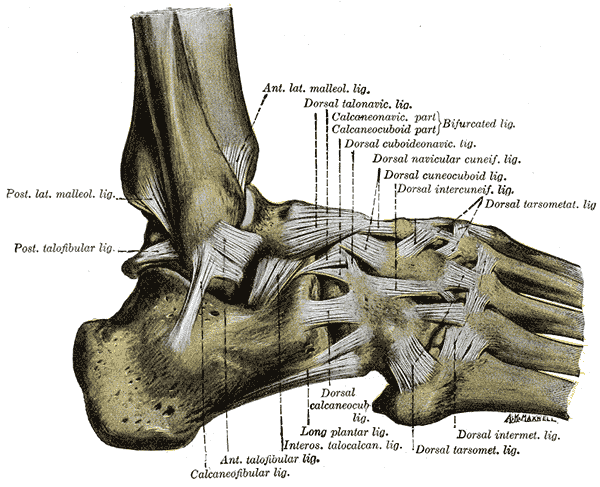
- The ligaments of the foot from the lateral aspect (anterior talofibular ligament labeled at bottom center left)

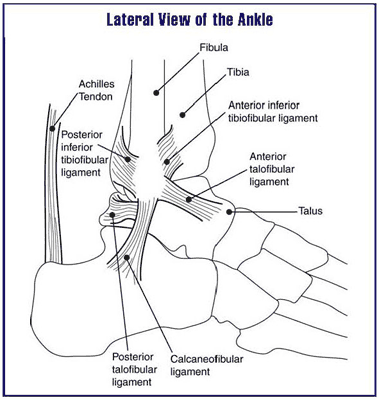
- Lateral view of the human ankle (anterior talofibular ligament labeled at center right)

Details
- From: Talus bone
- To: Fibula (lateral malleolus)

Identifiers
- Latin: ligamentum talofibulare anterius
- TA98: A03.6.10.009
- TA2: 1919
- FMA: 44083

The anterior talofibular ligament is a ligament in the ankle. It passes from the anterior margin of the fibular malleolus, passing anteromedially to insert at the lateral aspect of the talus at the talar neck, in front of its lateral articular facet. It is one of the lateral ligaments of the ankle and prevents the foot from sliding forward in relation to the shin. It is the most commonly injured ligament in a sprained ankle—from an inversion injury—and will allow a positive anterior drawer test of the ankle if completely torn.

== See also ==
- Sprained ankle
- Posterior talofibular ligament
