= Sprained ankle =

- Other names: Twisted ankle, rolled ankle, turned ankle
- Lateral view of the human ankle
- Specialty: Orthopedics, sports medicine, Physical medicine and rehabilitation, Family medicine
- Symptoms: Swelling, bruising, pain
- Diagnostic method: Physical examination
- Differential diagnosis: Maisonneuve fracture, high ankle sprain
- Treatment: Physical medicine and rehabilitation

A sprained ankle (twisted ankle, rolled ankle, turned ankle, etc.) is an injury where a sprain occurs on one or more ligaments of the ankle. It is the most commonly occurring injury in sports, mainly in ball sports (basketball, volleyball, and football) as well as racquet sports (tennis, badminton and pickleball).

Ankle sprains are also among the most common acute dance injuries, often causing pain around the ankle and, in more severe cases, swelling and bruising.

== Signs and symptoms ==
Knowing the symptoms that can be experienced with a sprain is important in determining that the injury is not really a break in the bone. When a sprain occurs, hematoma occurs within the tissue that surrounds the joint, causing a bruise. White blood cells responsible for inflammation migrate to the area, and blood flow increases as well. Along with this inflammation, swelling and pain is experienced. The nerves in the area become more sensitive when the injury is suffered, so pain is felt as throbbing and will worsen if there is pressure placed on the area. Warmth and redness are also seen as blood flow is increased. There is also decreased ability to move the joint.

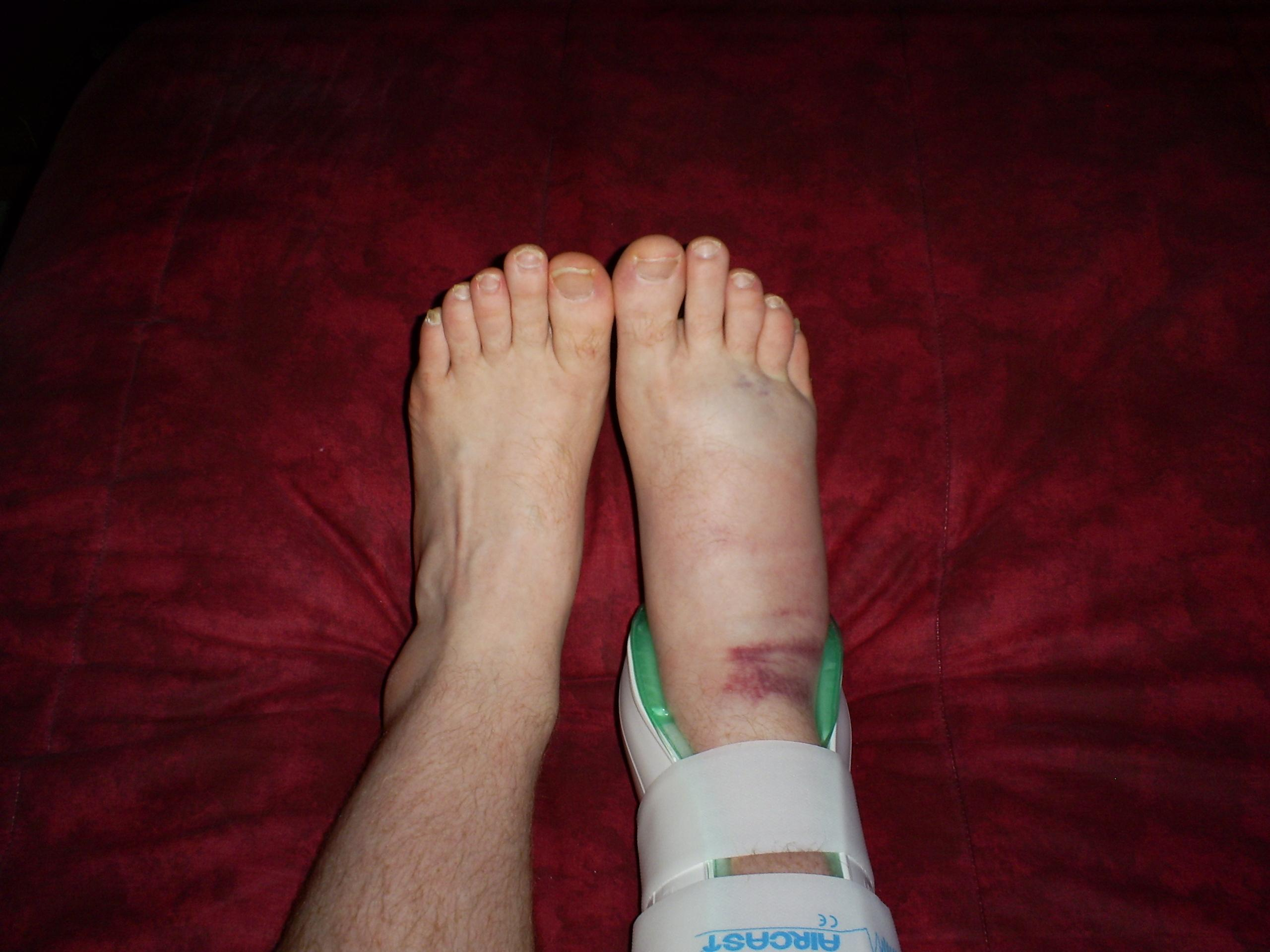
Right foot, housed in an air brace, has become swollen as a result of a more severe 2nd degree sprain to the ankle.

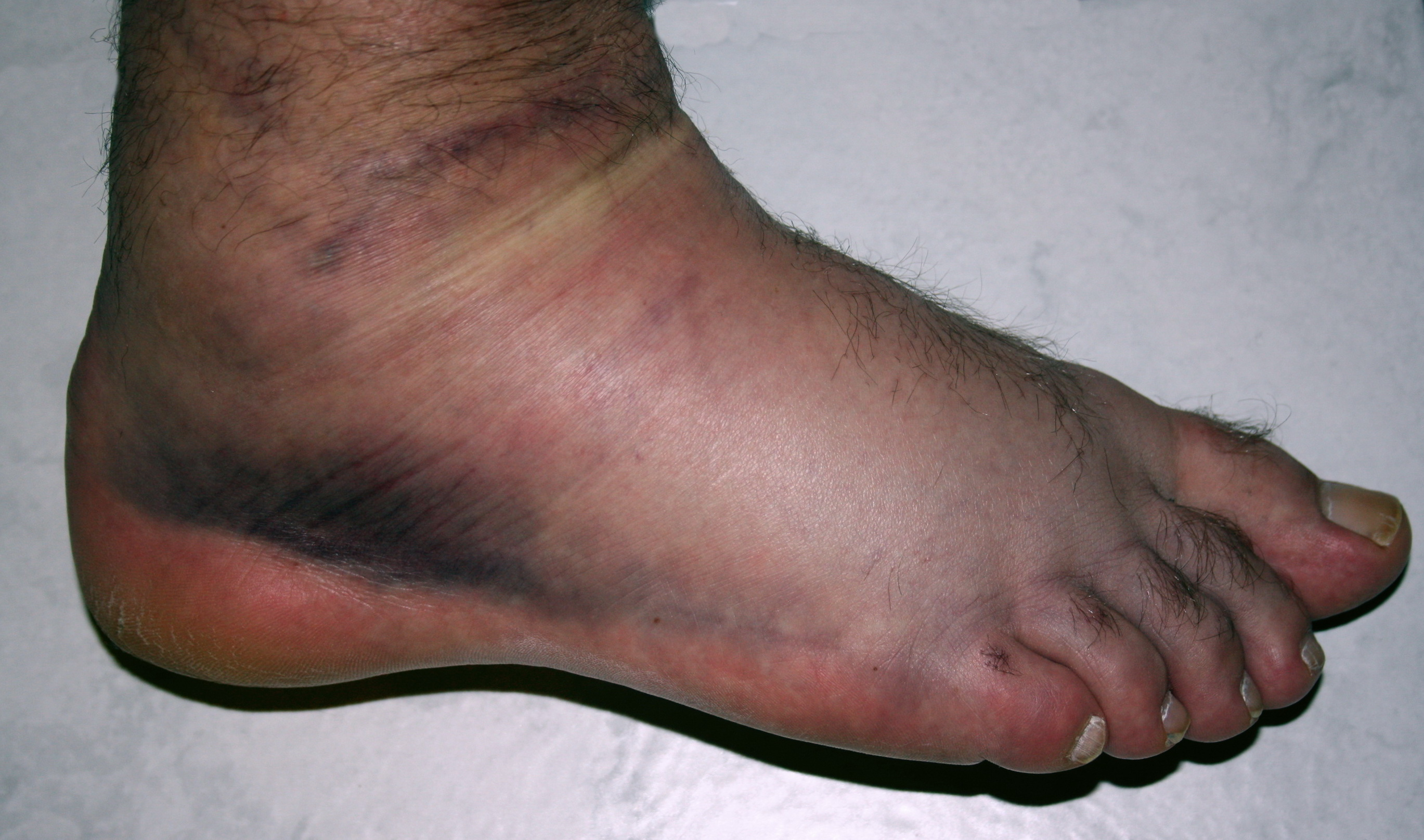
Right foot, 3rd degree sprain. One day after injury.

== Cause ==
Movements – especially turning, and rolling of the foot – are the primary cause of an ankle sprain.

The risk of a sprain is greatest during activities that involve explosive side-to-side motion, such as tennis, skateboarding or basketball. Sprained ankles can also occur during normal daily activities such as stepping off a curb or slipping on ice. Returning to activity before the ligaments have fully healed may cause them to heal in a stretched position, resulting in less stability at the ankle joint. This can lead to a condition known as Chronic Ankle Instability (CAI), and an increased risk of ankle sprains.

The following factors can contribute to an increased risk of ankle sprains:

- Weak muscles/tendons that cross the ankle joint, especially the muscles of the lower leg that cross the outside, or lateral aspect of the ankle joint (i.e. peroneal or fibular muscles)
- Weak or lax ligaments that join the bones of the ankle joint – this can be hereditary or due to overstretching of ligaments as a result of repetitive ankle sprains
- Inadequate joint proprioception (i.e., sense of joint position);
- Slow neuron muscular response to an off-balance position;
- Running or stepping on uneven surfaces;
- Shoes with inadequate heel support; and
- Wearing high-heeled shoes – due to the weak position of the ankle joint with an elevated heel, and a small base of support.

Ankle sprains occur usually through excessive stress on the ligaments of the ankle. This can be caused by excessive external rotation, inversion or eversion of the foot caused by an external force. When the foot is moved past its range of motion, the excess stress puts a strain on the ligaments. If the strain is great enough to the ligaments past the yield point, then the ligament becomes damaged, or sprained.

== Diagnosis ==
The diagnosis of a sprain relies on the medical history, including symptoms, as well as making a differential diagnosis, mainly in distinguishing it from strains or bone fractures. The Ottawa ankle rule is a simple, widely used rule to help differentiate fractures of the ankle or mid-foot from other ankle injuries that do not require x-ray radiography. It has a sensitivity of nearly 100%, meaning that a patient who tests negative, according to the rule almost certainly does not have an ankle fracture. If ankle pain is persistent 6–7 weeks after initial sprain, MRI imaging of the joint can be considered to rule out peroneal tendon, osteochondral, or syndesmotic injury.

=== Classification of severity ===
Ankle sprains are classified as grade 1, 2, or 3, and, depending on the amount of damage or the number of ligaments that are damaged, each sprain is classified from mild to severe. A grade 1 sprain is defined as mild damage to a ligament or ligaments without instability of the affected joint. A grade 2 sprain is considered a partial tear to the ligament, in which it is stretched to the point that it becomes loose. A grade 3 sprain is a complete tear of a ligament, causing instability in the affected joint. Bruising may occur around the ankle.

=== Types ===
==== Inversion (lateral) ankle sprain ====
The most common type of ankle sprain occurs when the foot rolls inwards, or has a force, typically one's body weight, causing it to internally rotate beyond its normal range, affecting the lateral side of the ankle. When this type of ankle sprain happens, the outer, or lateral, ligaments are stretched too much. The anterior talofibular ligament is one of the most commonly involved ligaments in this type of sprain, followed by the calcaneofibular ligament and posterior talofibular ligament respectively, the latter found in more severe ankle sprains. Approximately 70–85% of ankle sprains are inversion injuries.

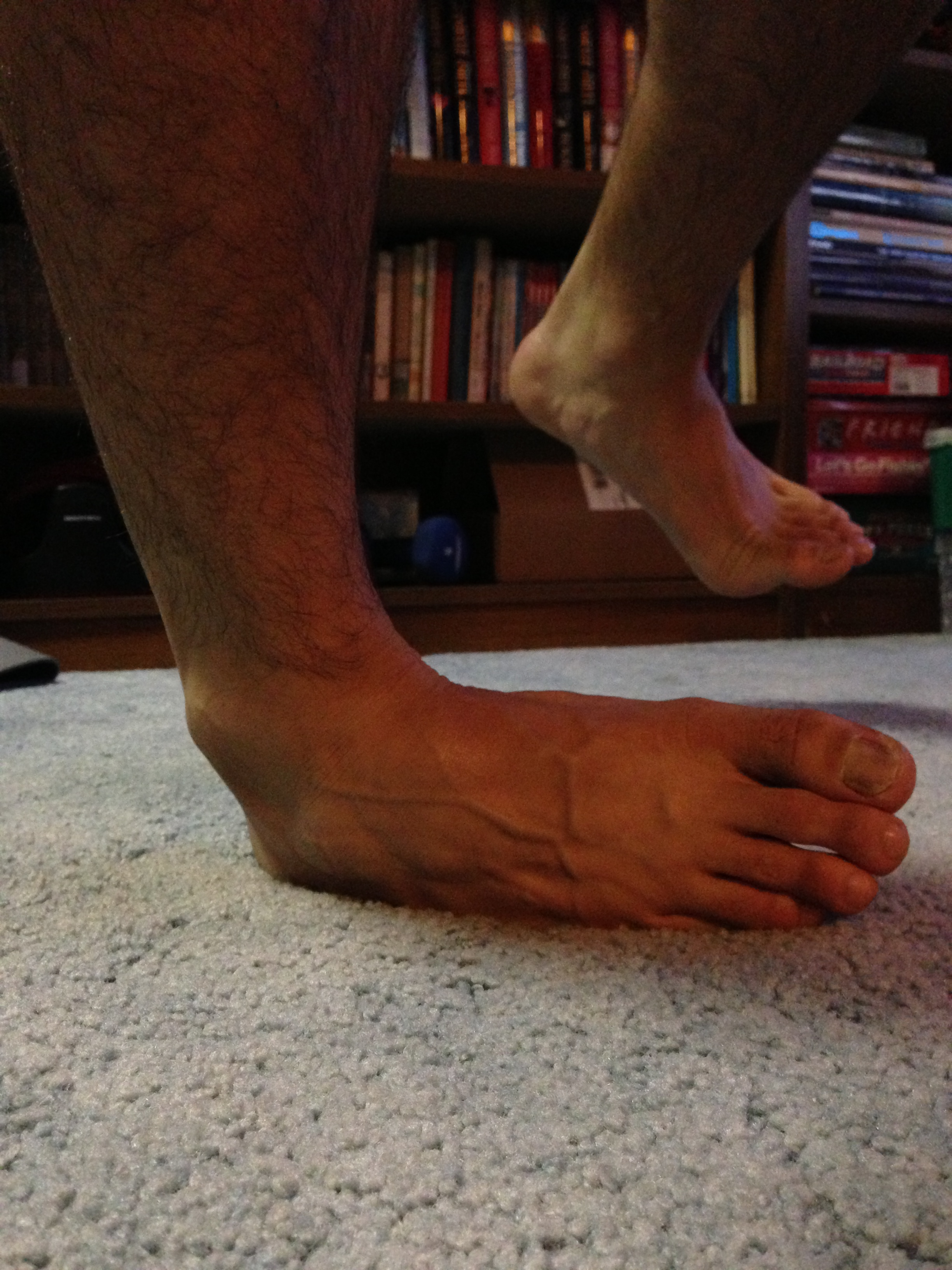
Ankle inversion

When the ankle becomes inverted, the anterior talofibular and calcaneofibular ligaments are damaged. This is the most common ankle sprain.

==== Eversion (medial) ankle sprain ====
A less common type of ankle sprain is called an eversion injury, affecting the medial side of the foot. This happens when, instead of the ankle rotating medially resulting in an inversion injury (the foot rolling too much to the inside), the ankle rotates laterally resulting in an eversion injury (when the foot rolls too much to the outside). When this occurs, the medial, or deltoid, ligament is strained.

==== High (syndesmotic) ankle sprain ====
A high ankle sprain is an injury to the large ligaments above the ankle that join the two long bones of the lower leg, called the tibia and fibula. High ankle sprains commonly occur from a sudden and forceful outward twisting of the foot. This commonly occurs in contact and cutting sports such as football, rugby, ice hockey, roller derby, basketball, volleyball, lacrosse, softball, baseball, track, ultimate frisbee, soccer, tennis and badminton and horse riding.

== Treatment ==
Initial treatment commonly consists of rest, icing, compression and elevation (which is often referred to by the mnemonic RICE or sometimes PRICE with P being "protection"). These elements have been recommended by physicians for decades for the treatment of soft tissue damage, and sprained ankles, one of the most common soft tissue injuries. RICE helps limit the amount of swelling to the area, and "facilitates venous and lymphatic drainage". While nearly universally accepted as a treatment, there is insufficient evidence to determine its relative effectiveness as therapy for acute ankle sprains in adults, and the National Athletic Trainers Association notes that most of the rationale for using RICE or individual components is based largely on low-quality clinical trials and laboratory studies with uninjured participants or animal models.

For most ankle sprains, functional treatment is generally preferred over immobilization. Studies have shown patients return to normal activities sooner when management is focused on restoring ankle function - typically by using braces, taping or elastic bandages, rather than complete immobilization such as a plaster casting. Functional treatment generally consists of three phases: the first is the RICE regime (rest, ice, compression, elevation) in the first 24 to 48 hours to reduce swelling and pain. The second phase is range of motion and ankle strengthening exercises within 48 to 72 hours. Finally the third phase involves progressive endurance and balance training during recovery.

The beginning of progressive exercise therapy must be made in the first week (ROM, balance, strengthening). RICE (rest, ice, compression, elevation) alone is no longer considered sufficient for full recovery from an ankle sprain.

Balance and Neuromuscular Training; Programs such as wobble board training, hopping exercises and single-leg balance with the help of balance reduce the recurrence rates of up to 40 and 50 percent.

Supervised vs. Home Rehab; Balance, strength and recovery to sport are better in supervised rehab programs than in supervised home exercise.

Bracing for Prevention; The possibility of preventing reinjury with ankle braces (semi rigid or lace up) is better than with taping, particularly in high-risk sports within the first 6 to 12 months.

=== Conservative measures ===
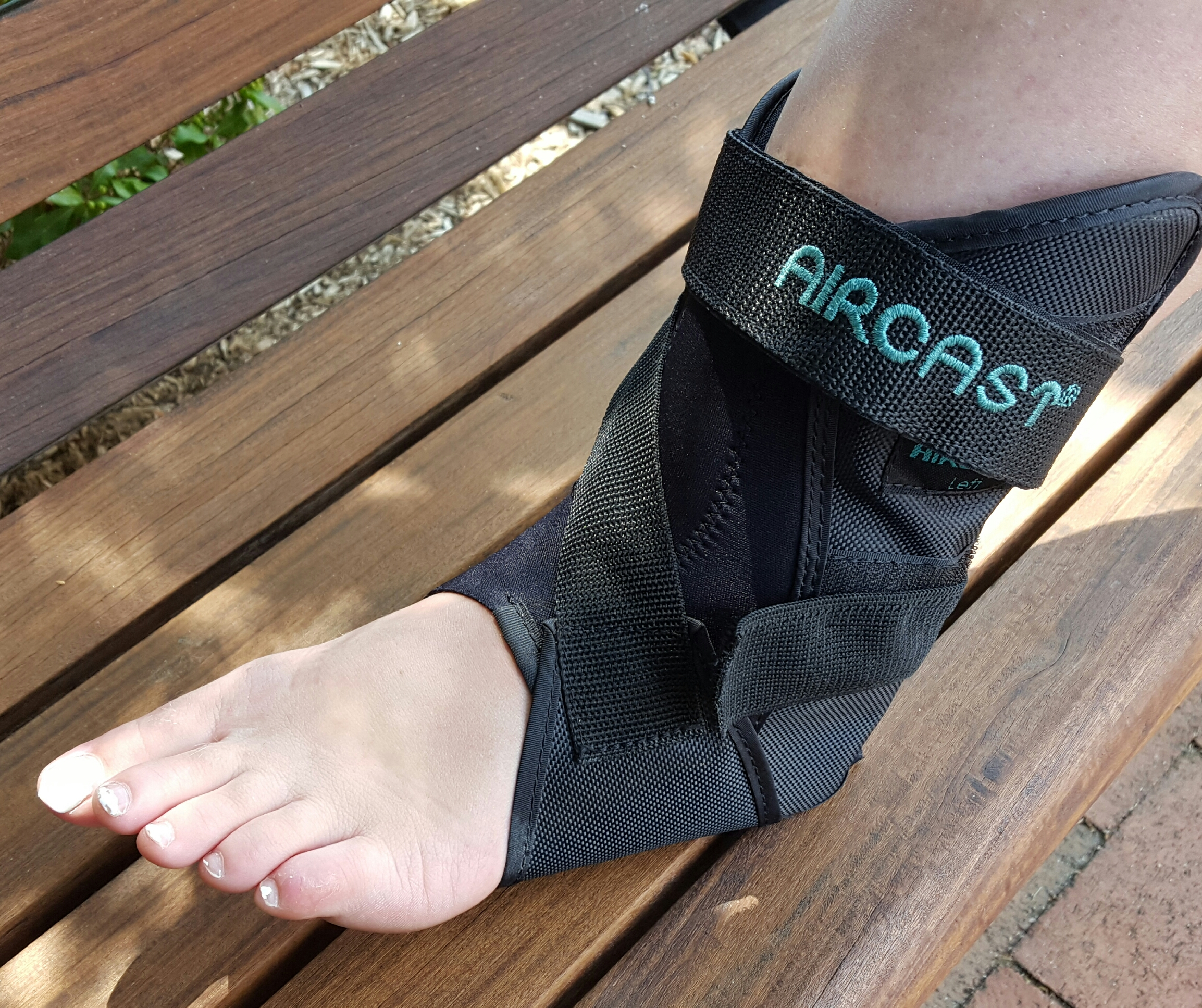
A brace offering moderate support and compression for a Grade I ankle sprain

Ice is often used to reduce swelling in cycles of 15–20 minutes on and 20–30 minutes off. Icing an ankle too long can cause cold injuries, which is indicated by the area turning white. Also, it is often recommended that ice not be applied directly to the skin, but should have a thin buffer between the ice and the affected area, and some professionals think ice need not be applied at all. Recently, Gabe Mirkin, MD, who coined and popularized the acronym RICE in his The Sportsmedicine Book in 1978, no longer recommends "complete" rest or ice for healing a sprain. After reviewing modern studies, he notes that because ice closes off the blood vessels, "ice doesn't increase healing—it delays it," and "complete Rest may delay healing." He now advises skipping ice altogether unless needed to reduce pain from swelling. A small but growing number of doctors no longer recommend RICE for sprains.

In uncomplicated lateral ankle sprains, swelling of the soft tissue can be prevented with compression around both malleoli, elevation of the injured ankle higher than the heart, and pain-free exercises.

An orthopedic walking boot is often used for the treatment of a sprained ankle injury. Braces and crutches are also used to help alleviate the pain so the injured ankle can heal as quickly and painlessly as possible.

Although found to be less effective than casts, compression bandages are used to provide support and compression for sprained ankles. Wrapping is started at the ball of the foot and slowly continued up to the base of the calf muscle; this allows the swelling to travel up toward the center of the body so that it does not gather in the foot. In addition, other external supports such as Kinesio taping does not "improve ankle functioning or performance in people with or without ankle injuries." The "current evidence does not support or encourage the use of Kinesio taping applied to the ankle for improvements in functional performance, regardless the population."

=== Rehabilitation and recovery ===
Many different types of rehabilitation exercises can be done to aid an ankle sprain regardless of the severity of the injury. The purpose of rehabilitation gives the ability for the ankle to regain strength and flexibility. A sprained ankle becomes swollen due to the increased amount of edema within the tissue. Physiologically, edema contributes to the sensation of pain in the ankle and so priority is given to allowing the fluid to leave the ankle. This can be done instantly by implementing the RICE mechanism which is resting the ankle, applying ice, compressing, and elevating it. The emphasis of the first week of rehabilitation should be on protecting the ankle to avoid further damage. As the healing progresses, stress can be applied by different mechanisms until the ankle is fully recovered. The key to a fast recovery is to implement all the different types of ankle sprain exercises so that the range of motion will increase while the pain is decreasing.

In cases where the ankle does not heal in an appropriate amount of time, other exercises need to be implemented so that strength and flexibility can be regained. Physical therapists assign different types of ankle sprain exercises that deal with ankle flexibility, strengthening, balance, and agility. If an ankle sprain does not heal properly, the joint may become unstable and may lead to chronic pain. Receiving proper treatment and performing exercises that promote ankle function is important to strengthen the ankle and prevent further injury.

==== Ankle immobilization ====
A short period of immobilization in a below-knee cast or in an Aircast leads to a faster recovery at 3 months compared to a tubular compression bandage. In contrast, a randomized controlled trial has concluded that appropriate exercise immediately after a sprain improves function and recovery. These exercises were focused on increasing ankle range of movement, activation and strengthening of ankle musculature, and restoring normal sensorimotor control, and were carried out for 20 minutes, three times a day. After the injury, it is advisable not to walk for a couple of days. Bed rest will help to accelerate the healing process and eliminate the chance of mishandling the affected limb. Driving vehicles or operating machinery should not be attempted. Acute lateral ankle sprain (LAS) is a common injury in athletes and is often associated with decreased athletic performance and, if treated poorly, can result in chronic ankle issues, such as instability. Physical performance demands, such as cutting, hopping, and landing, involved with certain sport participation suggests that the rehabilitation needs of an athlete after LAS may differ from those of the general population. Depending on the patient's goals, early dynamic training after an acute lateral ankle sprain in athletes can result in a shorter recovery time and reduced likelihood of reinjury

The amount of therapy that a person can handle will depend on their level of pain and the grade of sprain they experienced. It is not recommended to return to sports or extreme physical activities until hopping on the ankle is possible without pain. Wearing high-top tennis shoes may also help prevent ankle sprains if the shoes used are laced snugly and if the ankle is taped with a wide, nonelastic adhesive tape.

==== Ankle mobilization/manipulation ====
For acute ankle sprains, manual joint mobilization/manipulation of the ankle has been found to diminish pain and increase range of motion. For treatment of subacute/chronic lateral ankle sprains, these techniques improved ankle range-of-motion, decreased pain and improved function.

==== Ankle exercises ====
To prevent sprains or re-injury from occurring, strengthening and stretching exercises should be done through a full range of ankle motion. To improve ankle mobility, ankle circles can be performed by extending the legs in front of the body and then moving the foot up and down, side to side, or rotating the foot in a circle. Another common exercise to improve mobility, as well as proprioception, is to use the toes to draw the letters of the alphabet in the air. Most importantly, the lateral aspect of the ankle joint should be strengthened with eversion exercises (i.e., underside of the foot is turned outward against resistance) to improve lateral ankle stability. Stretching is also an important component of a strengthening program, to help maintain joint flexibility.

Balance and stability training are especially important to retrain the ankle muscles to work together to support the joint. This includes exercises that are performed by standing on one foot and using the injured ankle to lift the body onto its toes. To further enhance balance and stability, exercise devices such as the wobble board can be used, progressing from double-leg to single-leg stance, first with eyes open and then with eyes closed, for enhanced effectiveness.

==== Flexibility exercises ====
Flexibility exercises include a towel stretch and writing the alphabet with the toes, which will increase the range of motion.

==== Strengthening exercises ====
Ankle strengthening exercises are step ups and walking on toes which will strengthen the muscles around the swollen area. Rehabilitation exercises to strengthen the ankle has been shown to reduce the risk of re-injuring. Exercise prescription isn't clearly understood and deserves further research.

==== Balance exercises ====
Balance exercises include the use of a balance board, which helps the whole body function to maintain balance. The use of balance boards has been shown to produce significantly positive results in gaining proper balance. While performing balance exercises, the activity can be altered by using a single legged stance instead of a double legged stance, by opening or closing one's eyes, or changing the surface of balance to stable or unstable. This exercise can also be used for primary prevention of ankle sprains, as a meta-analysis exploring its efficacy in prevention showed that there is a significant decrease in ankle sprain incidence among those who perform these exercises compared to people who don't.

==== Agility exercises ====
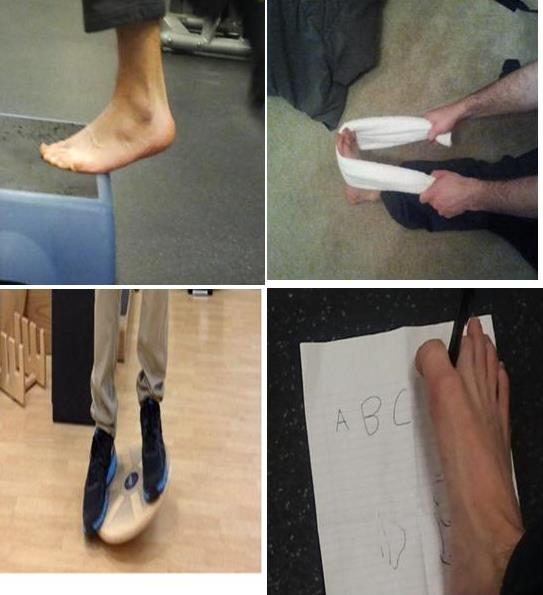
Rehabilitation exercises for an ankle sprain

Plyometrics exercises such as squat jumps and power skipping should not be implemented until the ankle has regained full agility.

Other strategies that can be used to prevent ankle injury include:

- Ensure proper warm-up prior to stretching and activity;
- When running, choose level surfaces and avoid rocks or holes;
- Ensure that shoes have adequate heel support;
- If high-heeled shoes are worn, ensure that heels are no more than two inches in height, and avoid heels with a narrow base.

== Prognosis ==
Most people improve significantly in the first two weeks. However, some still have problems with pain and instability after one year (5–30%). Re-injury is also very common. The risk of recurrence can reach one-third of cases. There are currently no published evidence-based criteria to inform RTS (return to sport) decisions for patients with a lateral ankle sprain injury. Return to sport decisions following acute lateral ankle sprain injury are generally time-based.

Mild sprains (Grades 1-2) relating to over stretching or partial tears typically begin to feel better in a few days to a week and heal by six weeks. More severe ankle sprains (Grades 2-3) involving a full tear or rupture could take more than a few weeks or months to fully recover. The mean time patients return to sports is 12.9 weeks. Average time to return to work after injury range from less than one week to two months.

== Epidemiology ==
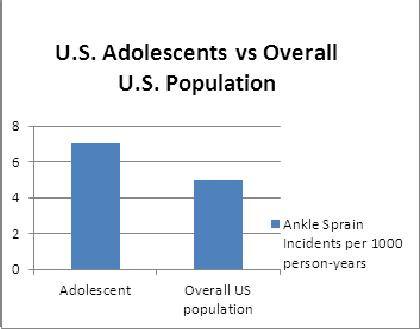
Adolescents vs general population ankle sprain instances

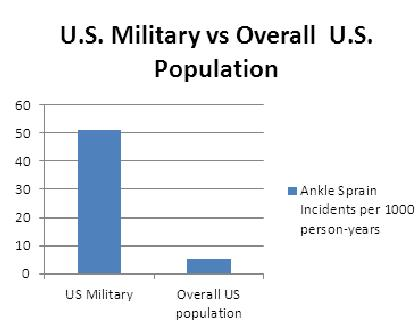
Ankle Sprain Epidemiology- U.S. Military vs General Population

Ankle sprains can occur through either sports or activities of daily living, and individuals can be at higher or lower risk depending on a variety of circumstances including their homeland, race, age, sex, or profession. In addition, there are different types of ankle sprains such as eversion ankle sprains and inversion ankle sprains. Overall, the most common type of ankle sprain to occur is an inversion ankle sprain, where excessive plantar flexion and supination cause the anterior talofibular ligament to be affected. A study showed that for a population of Scandinavians, inversion ankle sprains accounted for 85% of all ankle sprains. Most ankle sprains occur in more active people, such as athletes and regular exercisers.

=== Previous ankle sprains ===
When an ankle sprain occurs, subsequent ankle sprains are much more likely to follow. The rate of recurrence is particularly high for athletes in high-risk sports. The most widely recommended preventative measures for recurring sprains are wearing ankle-protective gear (tape, or ankle brace) and implementing exercises designed to strengthen the ankle and improve one's balance (e.g., balance ball exercises). In a review article of ankle sprain prevention research, the authors reference a season-long study on a group of soccer players. 60 players wore ankle-protective (tape or ankle-braces) throughout the soccer season, and another 171 players were enrolled in the control group, as they wore no ankle protective gear. At the end of the season, 17% of the players who did not wear ankle braces/tape sprained their ankles, while only 3% of the players who wore protection incurred the same injury. Amongst the players who sprained their ankles and did not wear ankle-protective gear, 25% had a history of previous ankle sprains. Another peer-reviewed article references a study which concluded that ankle exercising could decrease the risk of recurring sprains by 11%.

=== Age ===
In a study comparing the prevalence of ankle sprains between age, race, and sex, individuals who were aged 10–19 years old had highest instances of ankle sprains. It can be suggested that adolescents are more physically active, which leads to higher chances of ankle sprains. Since sports deal with high utilization of the ankle, over 50% of ankle sprains are due to sport-related injuries.

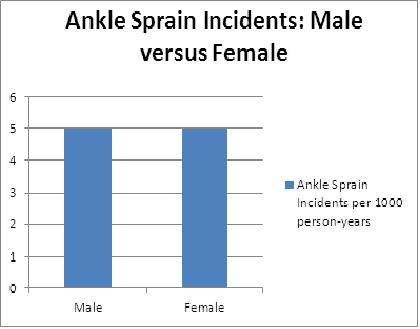
Ankle sprain incident rates of average males to females

=== U.S. military ===
Moreover, average ankle sprains for the general U.S. population are estimated at 5–7 ankle sprains for every 1000 person-years; however, a study showed that for military cadets, instances for ankle sprains were about 10 times those of the general population

=== Male vs. female ===
Another study comparing sex influences on ankle sprains found that male and female counterparts had similar incidence rates of ankle sprains. However, at a specific age range of 19–25 years old, males were found to have a substantially greater rate of ankle sprains than females. Furthermore, at ages 30 and over, females showed a higher incidence of ankle sprains than males. From this, it can be said that age and activity levels are better indicators of ankle sprain risks than gender.
