= Posterior talofibular ligament =

Ligament that connects the fibula to the talus bone in humans

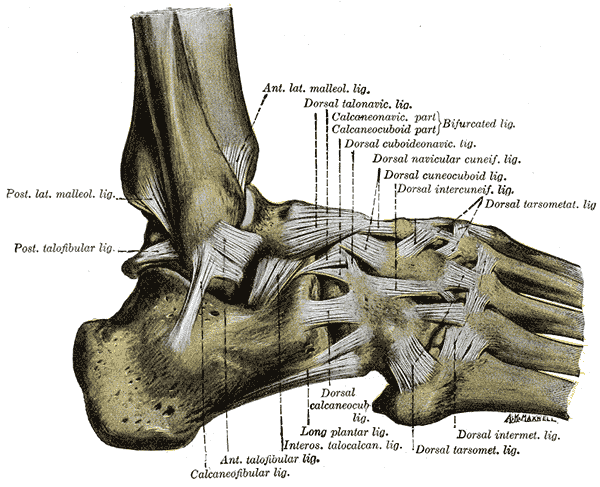
- The ligaments of the foot from the lateral aspect. (Post. talofibular lig. labeled at center left.)

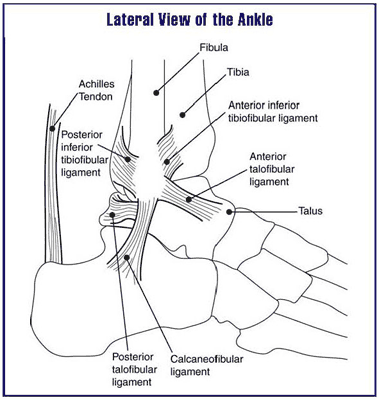
- Lateral view of the human ankle. (Posterior talofibular ligament labeled at bottom left.)

Details
- From: talus bone
- To: fibula (lateral malleolus)

Identifiers
- Latin: ligamentum talofibulare posterius
- TA98: A03.6.10.010
- TA2: 1920
- FMA: 44084

The posterior talofibular ligament is a ligament that connects the fibula to the talus bone. It runs almost horizontally from the malleolar fossa of the lateral malleolus of the fibula to the lateral tubercle on the posterior surface of the talus. This insertion lies immediately lateral to the groove for the tendon of the flexor hallucis longus.
