= Paul Georges Dieulafoy =

French physician and surgeon (1839–1911)

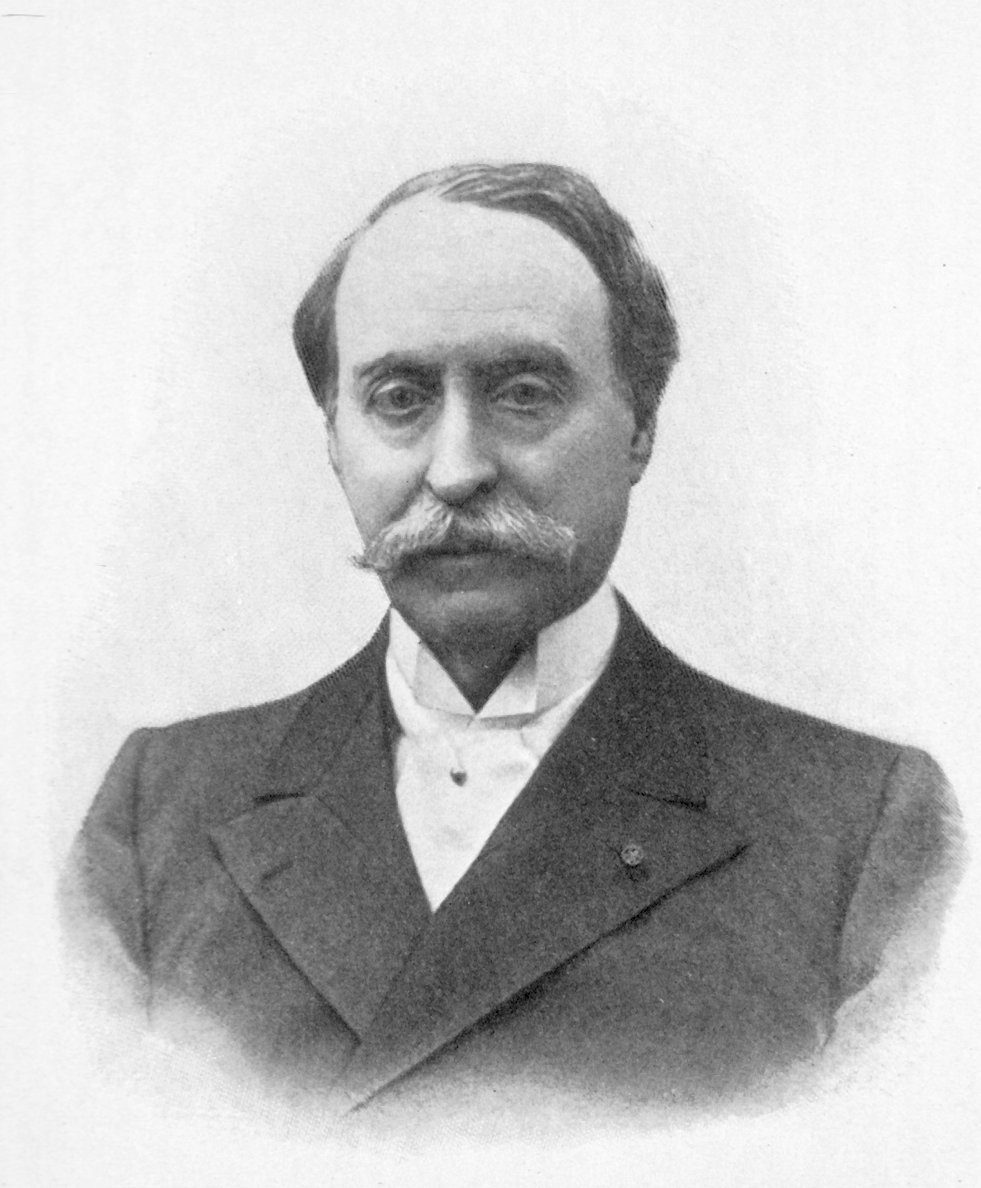
- Undated portrait of Dieulafoy
- Born: 18 November 1839; Toulouse, France
- Died: 26 June 1911 (aged 71); Paris, France
- Education: Académie Nationale de Médecine
- Spouse: Claire Bessaignet
- Scientific career
- Fields: Medical physician and surgeon
- Workplaces: Holy Trinity Church of Paris; Hôtel-Dieu de Paris; University of Paris

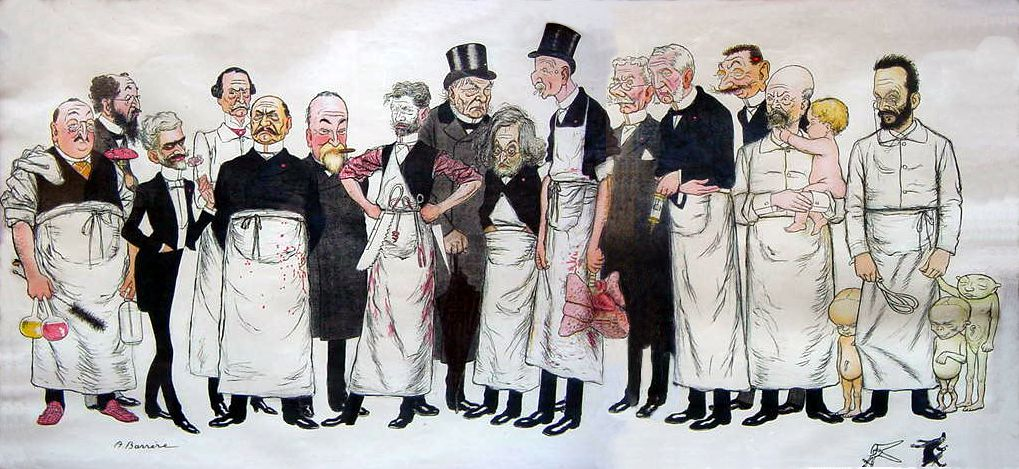
Members of the Paris Medical Faculty (1904), caricature by Adrien Barrère: André Chantemesse (1851–1919) Georges Pouchet (1833–1894) Paul Poirier (1853–1907) Paul Georges Dieulafoy (1839–1911) Georges Maurice Debove (1845–1920) Paul Brouardel (1837–1906) Samuel Jean de Pozzi (1846–1918) Paul Jules Tillaux (1834–1904) Georges Hayem (1841–1933) Victor André Cornil (1837–1908) Paul Berger (1845–1908) Jean Casimir Félix Guyon (1831–1920) Pierre-Emile Launois (1856–1914) Adolphe Pinard (1844–1934) Pierre-Constant Budin (1846–1907)

Paul Georges Dieulafoy (18 November 1839 – 16 August 1911) was a French physician and surgeon. He is best known for his study of acute appendicitis and his description of Dieulafoy's lesion, a rare cause of gastric bleeding.

== Life, studies, and career ==
Dieulafoy was born in Toulouse. He studied medicine in Paris and earned his doctorate in 1869. In 1863, during his third year of medical school, Dieulafoy went to Paris to attend the clinical department of Professor Armand Trousseau. The two men remained close until the former's death in 1867, with Dieulafoy being referred to as Trousseau's spiritual son. Dieulafoy later led an ambulance service at the Holy Trinity Church of Paris during the Franco-Prussian war, became Chief of Medicine at the famed Hôtel-Dieu de Paris, taught pathology in the University of Paris, and was elected president of the French Academy of Medicine in 1910 after being a member since 1890.

Dieulafoy married his cousin Claire Bessaignet in 1872, however the couple remained childless their entire marriage. He died in Paris on 16 August 1911 after post-surgery complications, and was buried in Montmartre cemetery.

== Contributions ==
He perfected a pump-like device for use in thoracentesis, and extensively studied pleurisy and liver conditions including hydatid disease and epidemic hepatitis. However, he is perhaps best known for his study of appendicitis. Dieulafoy described its early symptoms and clinical manifestations in detail, most notably the collection of symptoms now known as Dieulafoy's triad (more below), and was one of the first physicians to stress the importance of surgery in the treatment of this condition. He declared: "Le traitement médical de l'appendicite aiguë n'existe pas (The medical treatment of acute appendicitis does not exist)". His Handbook of Internal Pathology, published from 1880 to 1884, was widely used at the time. Between 1899 and 1910 he also published, in several volumes, the case reports from his private practice.

In 1890, Dieulafoy, André Chantemesse and Georges-Fernand Widal described a pulmonary condition found in persons who habitually fed pigeons in the streets. They termed it "mycotic pseudotuberculosis", now known as allergic bronchopulmonary aspergillosis.

== Eponyms ==
- Dieulafoy's lesion: the protrusion of an arteriole through the gastric mucosa, usually found just below the gastroesophageal junction; subsequent rupture of the arteriole is a rare cause of upper gastrointestinal bleeding
- Dieulafoy's triad: hyperesthesia of the skin, exquisite tenderness and guarding over McBurney's point, considered a classic sign of acute appendicitis
- Dieulafoy's apparatus: a pump-like device to evacuate fluid from the pleural cavity
