= André Chantemesse =

French bacteriologist

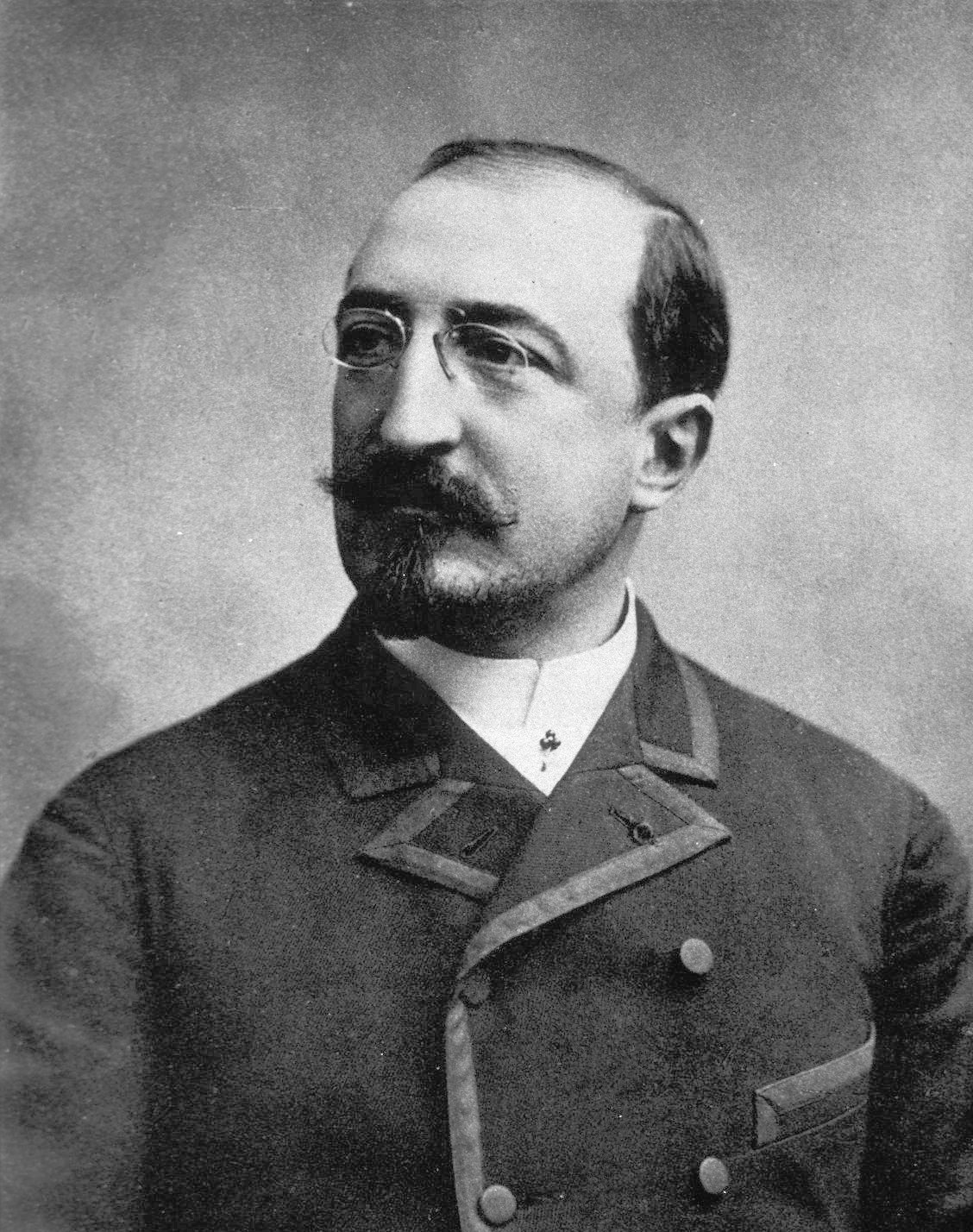
- André Chantemesse
- Born: 23 October 1851; Le Puy-en-Velay, France
- Died: 25 February 1919 (aged 67)
- Education: Académie Nationale de Médecine
- Known for: typhoid fever
- Scientific career
- Fields: bacteriology

André Chantemesse (23 October 1851 – 25 February 1919) was a French bacteriologist born in Le Puy-en-Velay, Haute-Loire.

From 1880 to 1885 he served as interne des hôpitaux in Paris, earning his doctorate in 1884 with a dissertation on adult tuberculous meningitis titled Étude sur la méningite tuberculeuse de l'adulte : les formes anormales en particulier. In 1885 he traveled to Berlin to study bacteriology at the laboratory of Robert Koch (1843–1910). After his return to Paris, he became associated with the work of Louis Pasteur.

In 1886, he began extensive research of typhoid fever. In collaboration with Georges-Fernand Widal (1862–1929), he studied the aetiology of the disease, and in 1888 developed an experimental antityphoid inoculation. Also with Widal, he isolated the bacillus that was the cause of dysentery, however the two scientists were unable to establish the aetiological link to the disease.

From 1897 to 1903 he was a professor of comparative and experimental pathology in Paris, becoming a member of the Académie Nationale de Médecine in 1901. In 1904 he became a member of the editorial board of Annales de l'Institut Pasteur.

His likeness, together with the rest of the Paris Faculty of Medicine, was included in a 1904 painting by Adrien Barrère. The image was intended to be satirical and the assembled professors give the impression of family butchers.

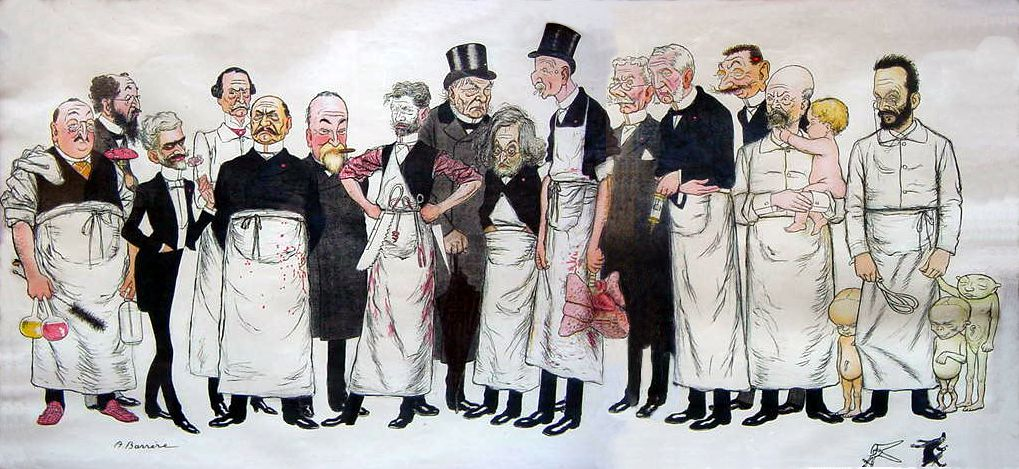
Members of the Paris Medical Faculty (1904), caricature by Adrien Barrère: André Chantemesse (1851–1919) Georges Pouchet (1833–1894) Paul Poirier (1853–1907) Paul Georges Dieulafoy (1839–1911) Georges Maurice Debove (1845–1920) Paul Brouardel (1837–1906) Samuel Jean de Pozzi (1846–1918) Paul Jules Tillaux (1834–1904) Georges Hayem (1841–1933) Victor André Cornil (1837–1908) Paul Berger (1845–1908) Jean Casimir Félix Guyon (1831–1920) Pierre-Emile Launois (1856–1914) Adolphe Pinard (1844–1934) Pierre-Constant Budin (1846–1907)

== Selected works ==
- De l’immunité contre le virus de la fièvre typhoïde conférée par des substances solubles. (with Georges-Fernand Widal; Annales de l’Institut Pasteur, Paris, 1888, 2: 54–59. experimental antityphoid inoculation).
- Sur les microbes de la dysentérie épidémique. Bulletin de l’Académie de médecine, Paris, 1888, 19: 522–529.
- Bibliothèque de la Tuberculose. 1910, a collection of monographs devoted to tuberculosis, with Antonin Poncet & Frédéric Justin Collet.

== Honors and awards ==
- Commander of the Order of Legion of Honour
- Order of Osmanieh

== See also ==
- Widal test
