= Samuel Jean Pozzi =

French physician

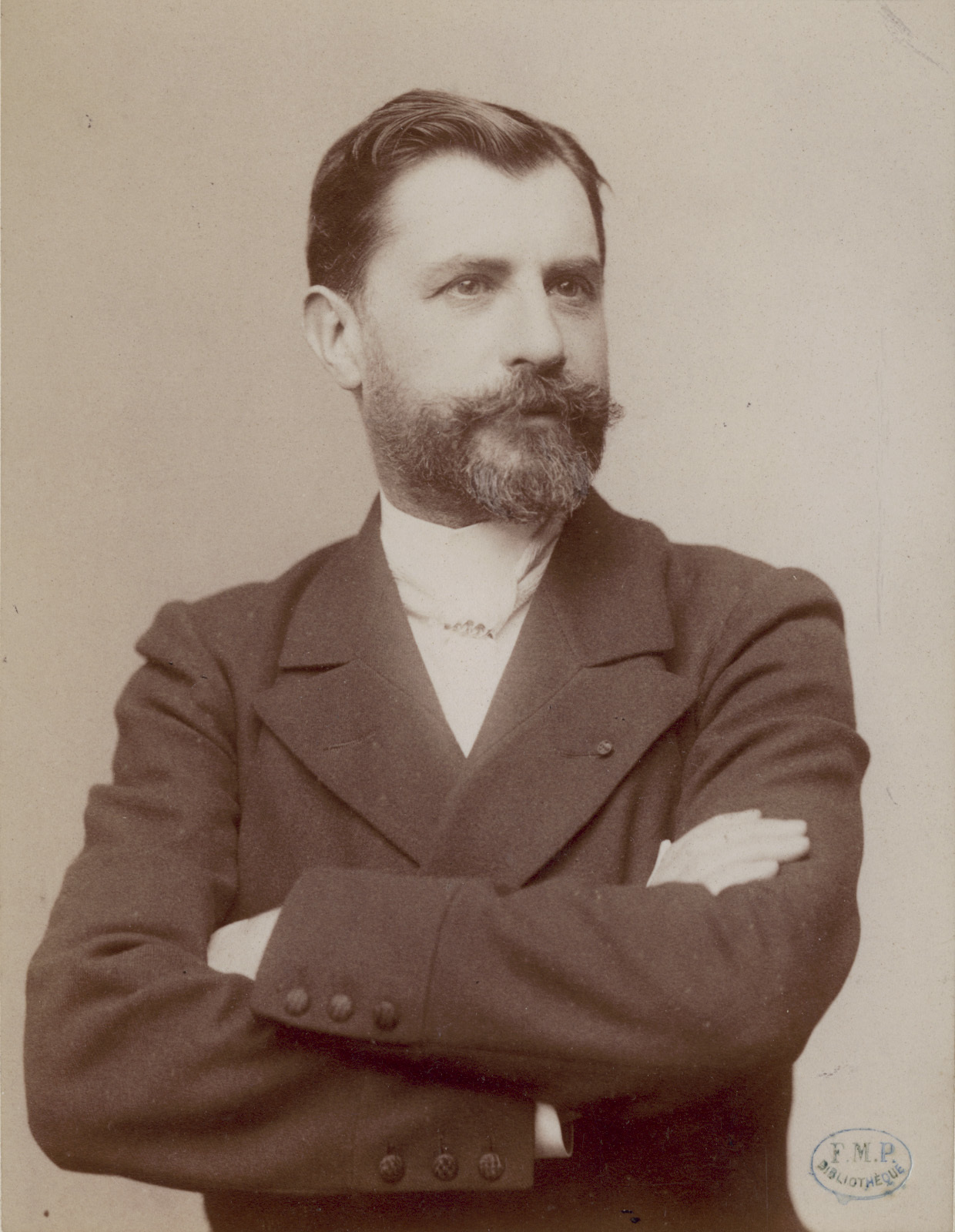
- Photograph by Pierre Petit
- Born: 3 October 1846
- Died: 13 June 1918 (aged 71)

Samuel Jean Pozzi (3 October 1846 – 13 June 1918) was a French surgeon and gynecologist. He was also interested in anthropology and neurology. He is remembered today for John Singer Sargent's portrait of him.

After studying medicine in Paris, Pozzi volunteered to be a medic during the Franco-Prussian War. He later specialized in gynecological and abdominal surgery, establishing the first Chair of Gynecology in Paris in 1884, and performing the first gastroenterostomy in France. Pozzi was elected to the French Academy of Medicine in 1896, and co-founded the Revue de gynécologie et de chirurgie abdominale in 1897.

His personal life was marked by a tumultuous marriage, multiple affairs, and cultural interests, including friendships with notable figures such as Sarah Bernhardt and Marcel Proust. In the political arena, Pozzi served as a senator for his hometown, Bergerac, and supported Alfred Dreyfus during his trial. He died in 1918, when a disgruntled patient fatally shot him.

== Early life ==
Samuel-Jean Pozzy was born in Bergerac, Dordogne to a family of Italian/Swiss descent. Samuel's father Benjamin Dominique Pozzy (20 March 1820 – 1905), a minister of the Reformed Church of France, married Marthe-Marie Inés Escot-Meslon (11 March 1821 – 1857) on 29 April 1844 in Bergerac, Dordogne, France. She died when Samuel was ten, and his father then married an Englishwoman, Mary Anne Kempe, on 19 October 1859 in Bakewell, Derbyshire, England. Pozzi later changed his surname to the more conventional spelling.

Pozzi went to study first to Pau and then to Bordeaux. For his handsome appearance and cultured demeanor, other pupils nicknamed him The Siren.

== Medical career ==
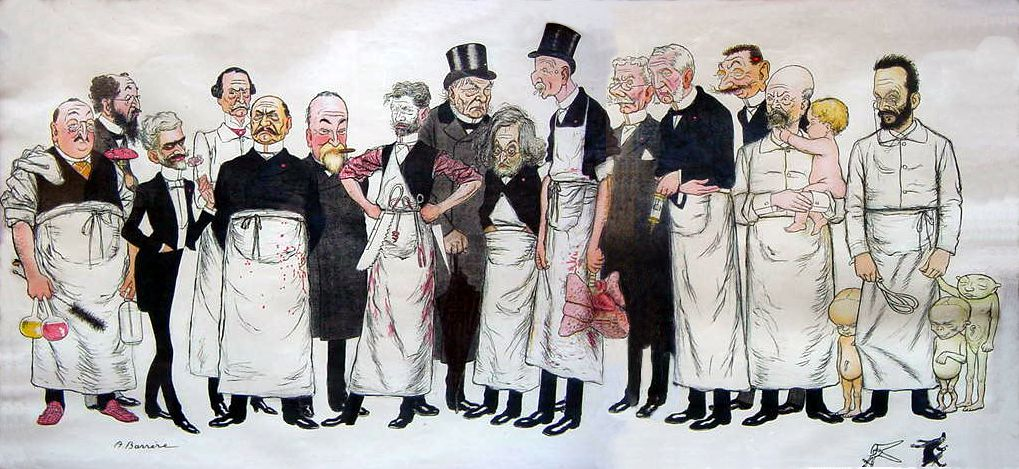
Caricature by Adrien Barrère Members of the Paris Medical Faculty (1904): André Chantemesse (1851–1919); Georges Pouchet (1833–1894); Paul Poirier (1853–1907); Paul Georges Dieulafoy (1839–1911); Georges Maurice Debove (1845–1920); Paul Brouardel (1837–1906); Samuel Jean Pozzi (1846–1918); Paul Jules Tillaux (1834–1904); Georges Hayem (1841–1933); Victor André Cornil (1837–1908); Paul Berger (1845–1908); Jean Casimir Félix Guyon (1831–1920); Pierre-Emile Launois (1856–1914); Adolphe Pinard (1844–1934); Pierre-Constant Budin (1846–1907)

In 1864, Pozzi began to study medicine in Paris. When the Franco-Prussian War broke out in 1870, he volunteered and became a medic. Later he was one of the pupils of the neurologist Paul Broca and as his assistant he worked with anthropology, neurology and comparative anatomy. Pozzi graduated as a doctor in 1873. The subject of his first thesis was fistula of the ischio-rectal fossa (4).

In 1875, Pozzi became a university teacher after his second thesis concerning the use of hysterotomy for uterine fibroids. In 1876, Pozzi traveled to Scotland to the Congress of the British Medical Association to meet Joseph Lister, whose interest in antiseptics he supported. In 1877, Pozzi became chirurgien des hôpitaux.

Pozzi went to Austria, Germany and Britain to study gynecological methods and became one of the pioneers of gynecology in France. He gained a reputation as a teacher, preferring to make his rounds dressed in white overalls and wearing a black cap.

In 1881, Pozzi became a hospital surgeon, specializing in gynecological and abdominal surgery. In 1883, he was appointed surgeon at the Hôpital de Lourcine-Pascal. After 1884 he gave theoretical lectures in the hospital. In 1888, he became a president of the Society of Anthropology – he had been a member since 1870. He traveled widely to supplement his knowledge.

Pozzi established the first Chair of Gynecology in Paris in 1884. In 1889, he performed the first gastroenterostomy in France. In 1896, he was elected to the French Academy of Medicine. In 1897, he was a co-founder of the Revue de gynécologie et de chirurgie abdominale.

In 1913, Pozzi and Georges Clemenceau organized the first transplant symposium in Paris. In 1914, he rejoined the army when the First World War broke out and became a military surgeon.

== Personal life ==
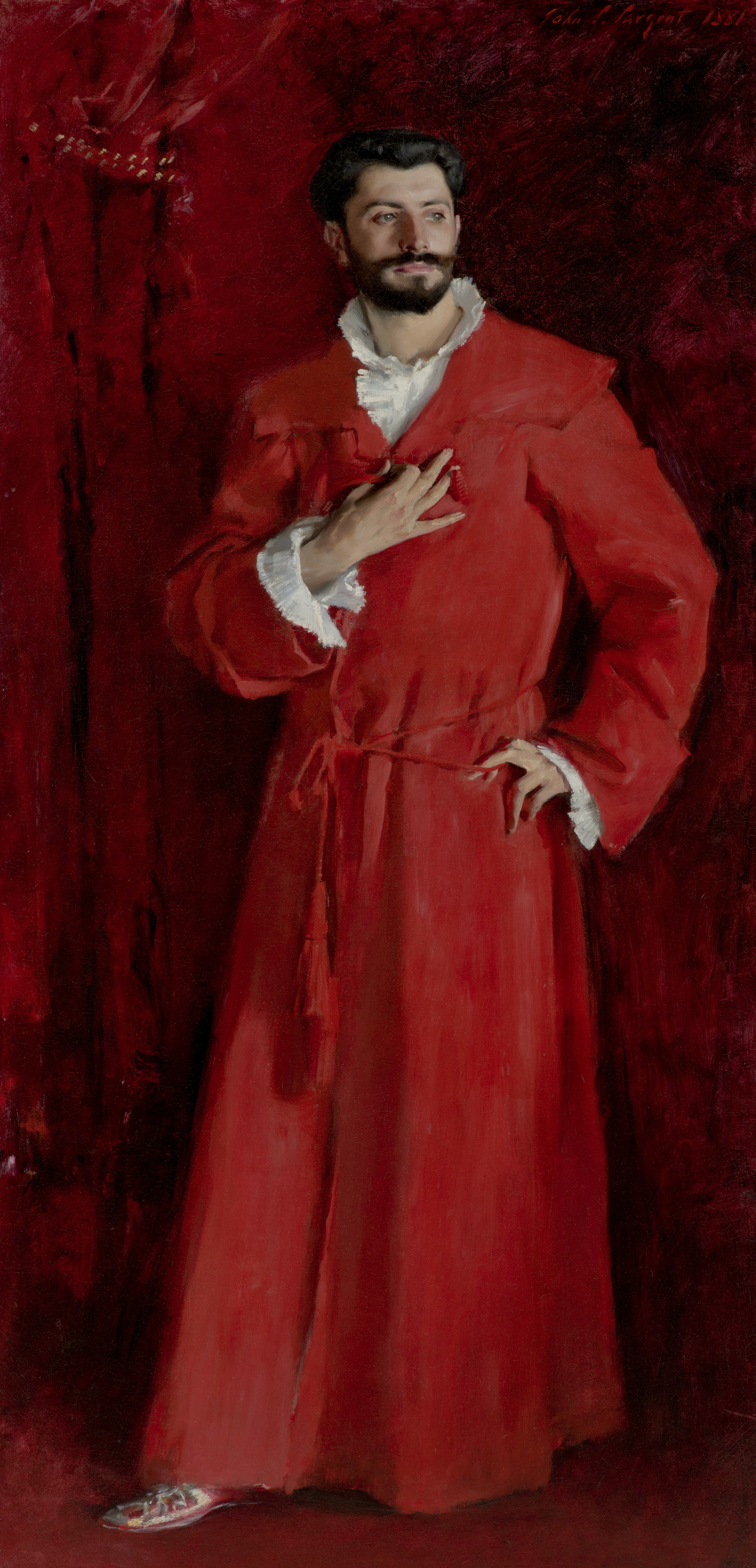
John Singer Sargent, Dr. Pozzi at Home, 1881

In 1879, Pozzi married Thérèse Loth-Cazalis, heiress of a railroad magnate, and they had three children: Catherine, Jean, and Jacques. His wife wanted her mother to live with them, which made for tensions in the marriage. Pozzi also had affairs: with the opera singer Georgette Leblanc, the actress Réjane, the widow of Georges Bizet, Sarah Bernhardt, and Emma Sedelmeyer Fischhof. The daughter of an art dealer and wife of a horse breeder, Fischhof was a beautiful, cultured woman of Jewish heritage who became Pozzi's mistress in 1890. His wife refused to grant him a divorce, but Fischhof remained his companion for the rest of his life.

=== Relationship with Sarah Bernhardt ===
In his early days in Paris, Pozzi had met Sarah Bernhardt through a childhood friend, the actor Jean Mounet-Sully. According to Gustave Schlumberger, they briefly became lovers, then remained lifelong friends afterwards. In 1898, he commissioned painter Georges Clairin—a longtime friend—to paint a painting for the wall of his Hospital, Lourcine. Sketches by Clairin from when he painted murals on the walls of Pozzi's house are included in the illustrations in The Diva and Dr God (1). In 1898, Bernhardt insisted on Pozzi operating on her ovarian cyst. In 1915, she called on him again, and Pozzi arranged for a colleague to amputate her damaged leg.

== Political and cultural interests ==
Pozzi became an honorary member of the Cercle de l'Union artistique (known as the Mirlitons) in 1881, and met the painter John Singer Sargent. Sargent's 1881 portrait of Pozzi depicts him in a red dressing gown and is currently displayed at the UCLA Hammer Museum in Los Angeles.

Pozzi befriended Marcel Proust, Robert Proust, Reynaldo Hahn, and Robert de Montesquiou. In 1877 he came to know poet Louise Ackermann, when he asked her to teach him German. Salonniere Lydie Aubernon nicknamed him "the love doctor". He corresponded with a feminist writer Augustine Bulteau.

He also collected coins and statuettes. Pozzi's private collection of ancient Greek coins was one of the most important of his time; a selection of the better pieces was sold at auction in the celebrated Ars Classica - Naville sale of 4 April 1921 in Lucerne, and provenance to his collection is still highly prized by numismatists.

In 1898 Pozzi was elected senator from Bergerac and represented his district for three years. He improved the water supply and sewer drainage of his town and was later involved with the restructuring of the French baccalaureate exams. He did not seek re-election in 1902.

Pozzi witnessed the second trial of Alfred Dreyfus and supported Émile Zola, who wrote J'Accuse...! in support of Dreyfus's innocence. In 1908, Zola's ashes were transferred to the Pantheon and both Pozzi and Dreyfus were present. When the journalist Gregori shot Dreyfus and wounded him on the arm, Pozzi rushed to his aid.

== Death ==
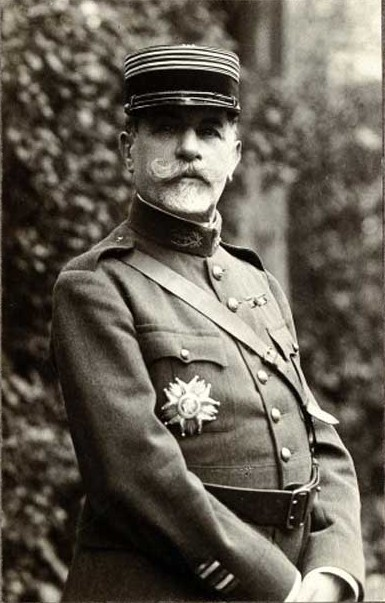
Samuel Jean Pozzi (1918)

On 13 June 1918, Maurice Machu, a patient from 1915, approached Pozzi in his consulting room. Pozzi had operated on him for varicocele of the scrotum, and he believed he had become impotent as a result. Machu asked him to operate again. When Pozzi refused and advised Machu that he was "suffering from a nervous complaint", Machu shot him three times: "in the arm, the chest and the gut (or, alternatively, in the arm, the stomach and the back)". Then Machu shot himself in the head. Pozzi ordered himself to be taken to the Astoria Hospital, which had been converted into a military hospital for wounded from WW I, but the emergency laparotomy was unsuccessful. He asked to be buried in his military uniform and died shortly afterwards.

Pozzi was buried in the Protestant cemetery in Bergerac. He was survived by his diplomat son Jean Pozzi, poet daughter Catherine Pozzi, and an institutionalized son, Jacques.

== Publications ==
- Étude sur les fistules de l’espace pelvi-rectal supérieur etc. Doctoral thesis, Paris, 1871
- De la valeur de l’hystérotomie dans le traitement des tumeurs fibreuses de l’utérus. Thèse d’agrégation, Paris, 1875
- Traité de gynécologie clinique et opératoire Paris, 1890; 2nd edition, 1891; 4th edition, 1905–1907. Translated into six languages.

Pozzi wrote over 400 papers on surgery. His gynaecology text of 1890 was translated into five languages, and with revisions remained an authority to the 1930s.

In 1874, Pozzi and Réné Benoit published a translation of Charles Darwin's The Expression of the Emotions in Man and Animals. He wrote the first French texts about antiseptic methods, after his visit to Lister.

== See also ==
- The Man in the Red Coat
