= Pierre-Émile Launois =

French physician

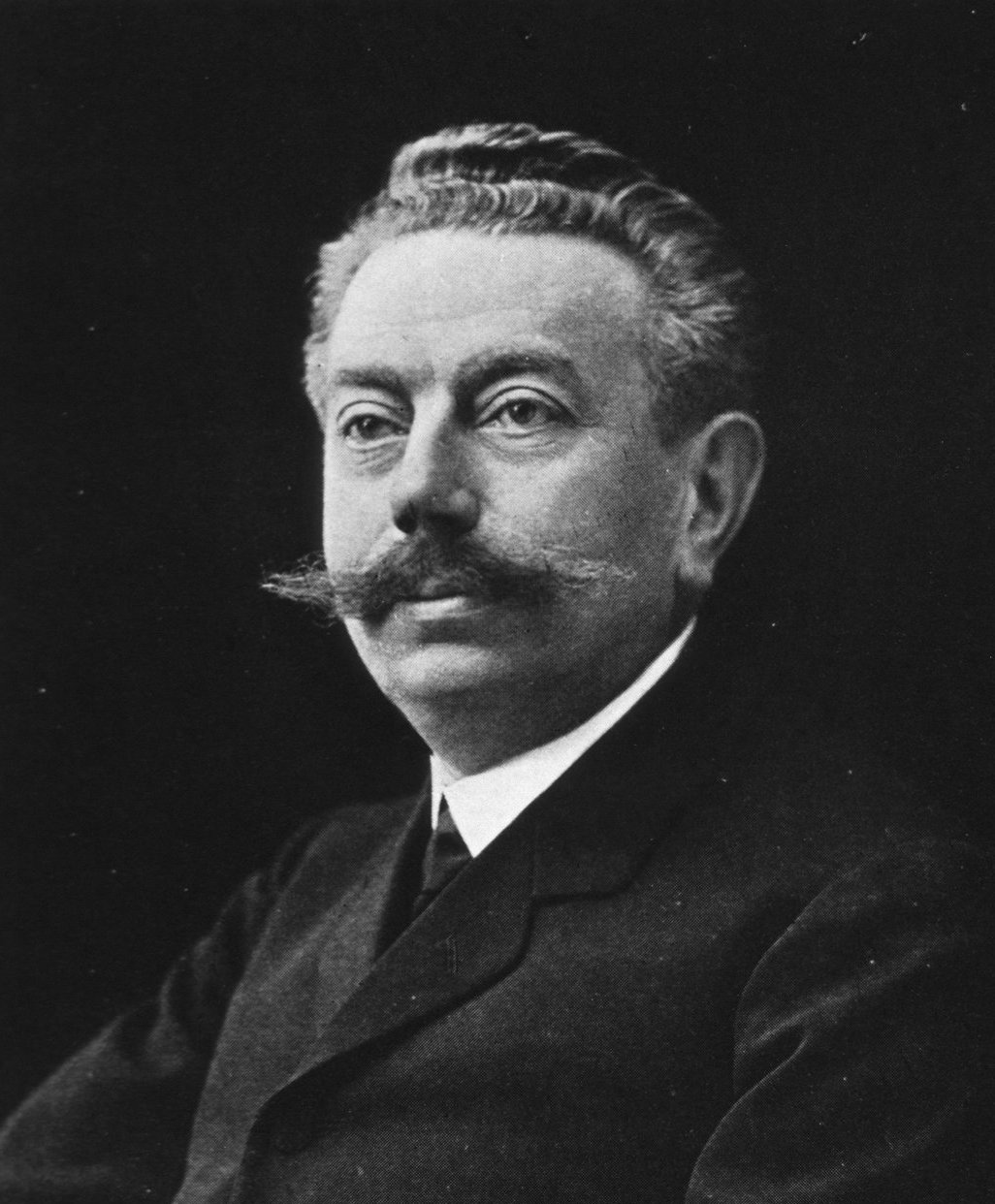
- Pierre-Émile Launois
- Born: July 24, 1856; Moiremont, Marne, France
- Died: March 18, 1914 (aged 57)
- Occupation: Physician

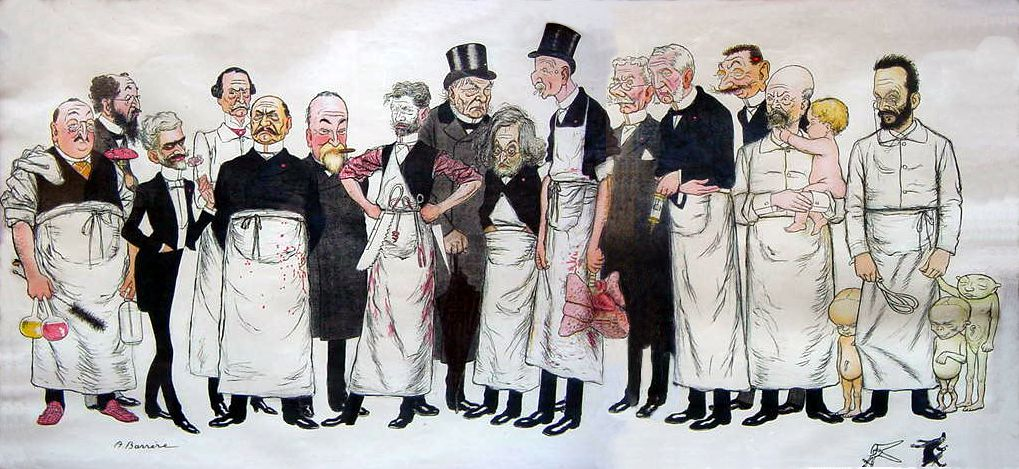
Members of the Paris Medical Faculty (1904), caricature by Adrien Barrère: André Chantemesse (1851–1919) Georges Pouchet (1833–1894) Paul Poirier (1853–1907) Paul Georges Dieulafoy (1839–1911) Georges Maurice Debove (1845–1920) Paul Brouardel (1837–1906) Samuel Jean de Pozzi (1846–1918) Paul Jules Tillaux (1834–1904) Georges Hayem (1841–1933) Victor André Cornil (1837–1908) Paul Berger (1845–1908) Jean Casimir Félix Guyon (1831–1920) Pierre-Emile Launois (1856–1914) Adolphe Pinard (1844–1934) Pierre-Constant Budin (1846–1907)

Pierre-Émile Launois (24 July 1856 – 18 March 1914) was a French physician born in Moiremont, a commune in the department of Marne.

He studied in Reims and Paris, where in 1885 he earned his medical doctorate. He became médecin des hôpitaux in 1895, and professeur agrégé of histology in 1898. Afterwards he worked at the Hôpital Lariboisière.

Launois published several articles in the field of histology, but is primarily known for his studies involving the pituitary gland. His name is lent to "Launois' syndrome", which is also referred to as pituitary gigantism. In 1910, with M. Cléret, he described "syndrome hypophysaire adiposo-génital", known today as adiposogenital dystrophy, a disorder associated with an adenohypophysial tumour or lesions of the hypothalamus.

With Raoul Bensaude (1866–1938), he described multiple symmetrical lipomatosis, a disease sometimes known as "Launois-Bensaude syndrome".

== Selected written works ==
- Manuel d'anatomie microscopique et d'histologie, with Henri Morau. Paris 1891; 2nd edition, 1900
- Manuel des travaux pratiques d'histologie, Paris 1897
- Conférences d'histologie appliquée sur les muqueuses, Paris 1905
- Les pères de la biologie, Paris 1905
- Les nouveaux traitements dans les malades nerveuses, with A. Porot. Paris 1907.
- Le syndrome hypophysaire adiposo-génital. Gazette des hôpitaux, with M. Cléret. Paris, 1910, 83: 57–64, 83–86.
