= Pierre-Constant Budin =

French obstetrician (1846–1907)

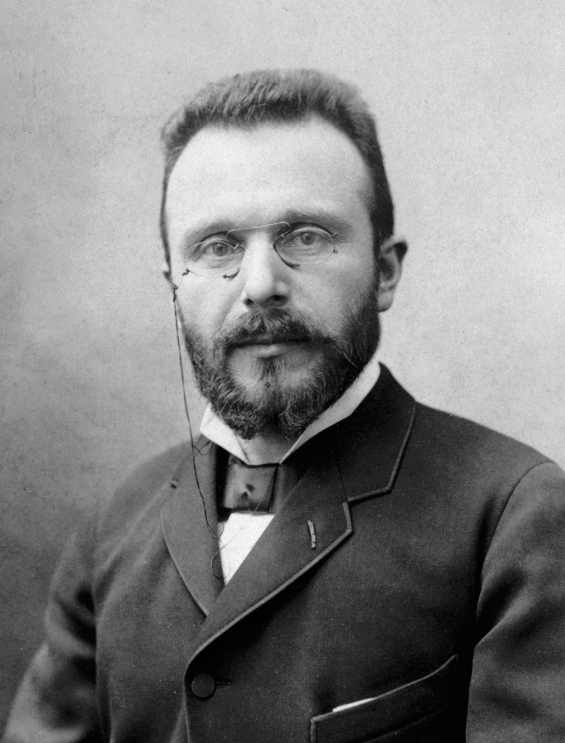
Pierre-Constant Budin

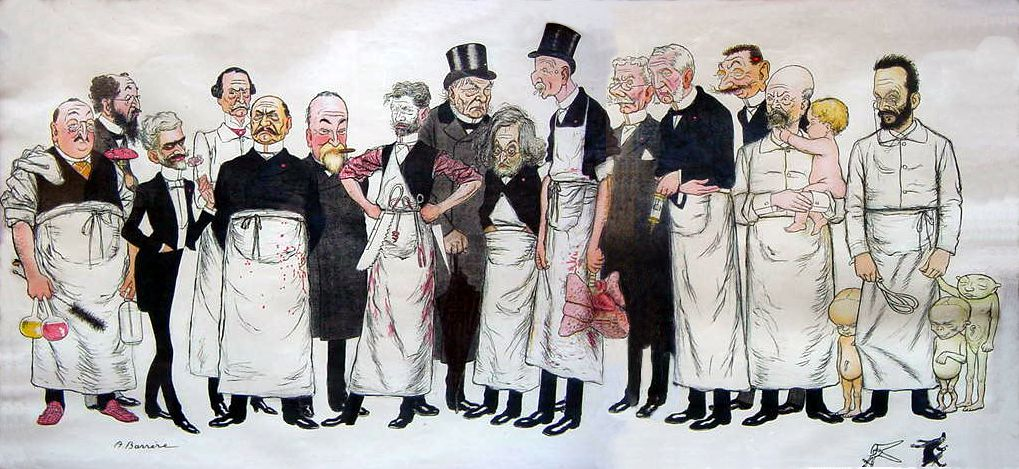
Members of the Paris Medical Faculty (1904), caricature by Adrien Barrère: André Chantemesse (1851–1919) Georges Pouchet (1833–1894) Paul Poirier (1853–1907) Paul Georges Dieulafoy (1839–1911) Georges Maurice Debove (1845–1920) Paul Brouardel (1837–1906) Samuel Jean de Pozzi (1846–1918) Paul Jules Tillaux (1834–1904) Georges Hayem (1841–1933) Victor André Cornil (1837–1908) Paul Berger (1845–1908) Jean Casimir Félix Guyon (1831–1920) Pierre-Emile Launois (1856–1914) Adolphe Pinard (1844–1934) Pierre-Constant Budin (1846–1907)

Pierre-Constant Budin (French pronunciation: [pjɛʁ kɔ̃stɑ̃ bydɛ̃]; 9 November 1846 – 22 January 1907) was a French obstetrician who was a native of Enencourt-le-Sec, a village in northern France.

In 1876 he earned his medical degree in Paris, and in 1882 became chief obstetrician at the Hôpital de la Charité. In 1895 he succeeded Étienne Stéphane Tarnier (1828–1897) as chair of obstetrics at the Hôpital Maternité. Budin was a member of the Académie de Médecine, and an officer of the Légion d'honneur.

Pierre Budin was a founder of modern perinatal medicine, and made many contributions in efforts to reduce infant mortality. He stressed the importance of proper nutrition and prevention of infectious disease in newborns, as well as education of new mothers on these subjects. Due to the problem of gastroenteritis in infants caused by contaminated cow's milk, Budin was a major proponent of breastfeeding, and believed in a substitution of sterilized milk if natural nutrition failed. He also popularized a technique known as gavage for feeding premature infants who were too weak to receive nourishment by conventional methods.

He was the author of Le nourrisson: alimentation et hygiène - enfants débiles, enfants nés à terme (1900), a book that was later translated into English as The Nursling. The Feeding and Hygiene of Premature and Full-Term Infants (1907).

== Associated eponyms ==
- Budin's obstetrical joint:, Also known as the posterior intra-occipital joint, which is a band of cartilage seen in newborns, situated between the squamous and the two rounded prominences of the occipital bone.
- Budin's rule: A rule that states that a bottle-fed infant should not consume more than 10% of its own weight of cow's milk per day.
