= Paul Brouardel =

French pathologist, hygienist, and member of the Académie Nationale de Médecine

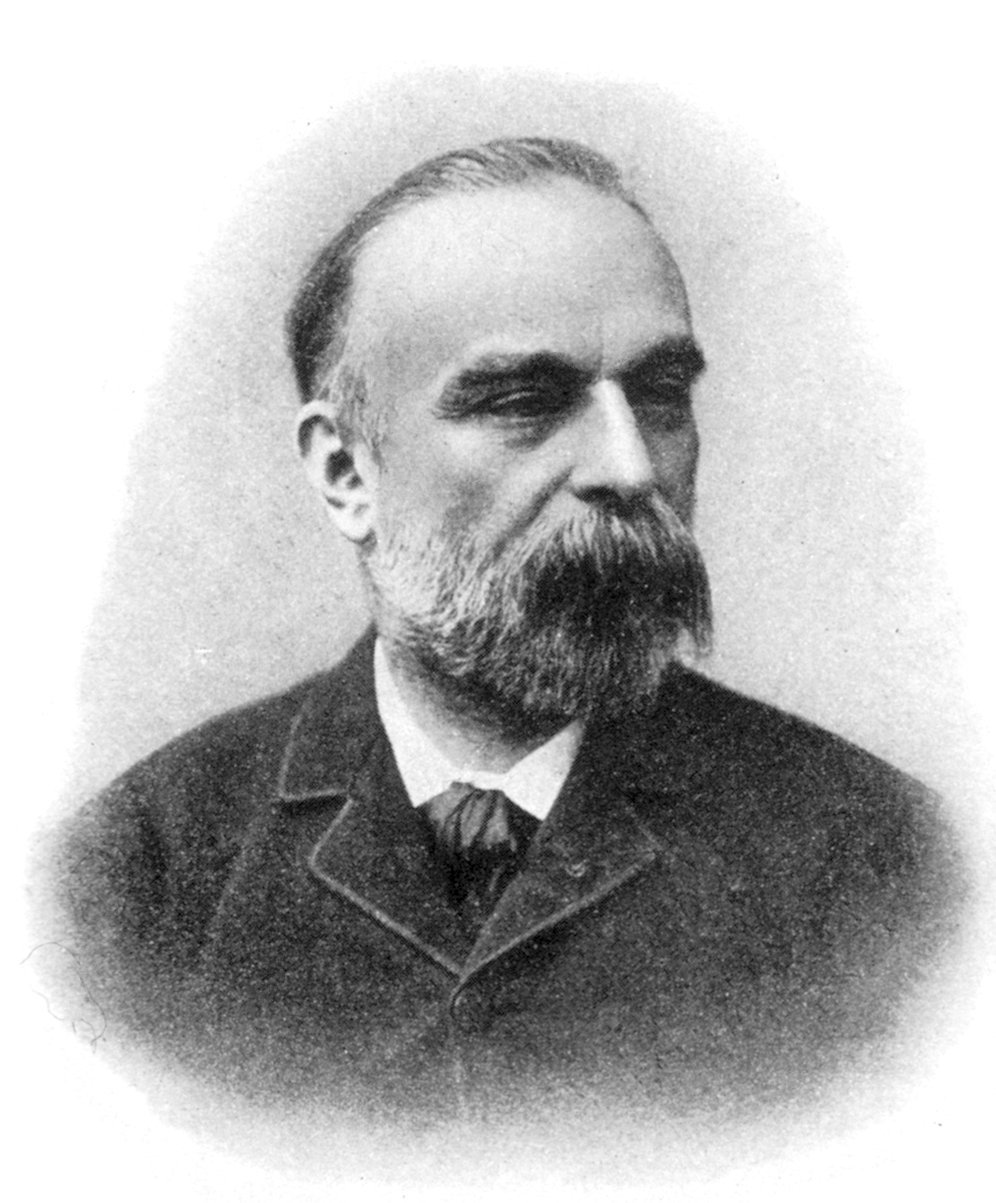
Paul Brouardel

Paul Camille Hippolyte Brouardel (13 February 1837, Saint-Quentin, Aisne – 23 July 1906) was a French pathologist, hygienist, and member of the Académie Nationale de Médecine.

In 1858 he became an externe at the Hôpital Cochin in Paris, and in 1865 earned his medical doctorate. In 1873 he became director of medical services at the Hôpital Saint-Antoine and la Pitié. In 1879 he became a professor of forensics at the Faculté de Médecine de Paris, and succeeded Auguste Ambroise Tardieu (1818–1879) as doyen of French forensic medicine. From 1884 to 1904 he was chair of the Consultative Committee of Hygiene, and in 1899 was elected president of the French Association for the Advancement of Sciences (AFAS).

Brouardel was the leading authority of French forensic medicine, and was also a passionate advocate concerning all aspects of public health and hygiene. He was at the forefront of issues such as food safety, tuberculosis, venereal disease, child abuse, alcoholism and public decency. Brouardel was a major influence on the career of neurologist Georges Gilles de la Tourette (1857–1904).

With physician Ernest Mosny (1861–1918), he was co-author of the multi-volume Traité d'hygiène, and with Augustin Nicolas Gilbert (1858–1927) and Joseph Girode, he published the 10-volume Traité de médecine et de Thérapeutique (1895–1902).

== Additional writings ==
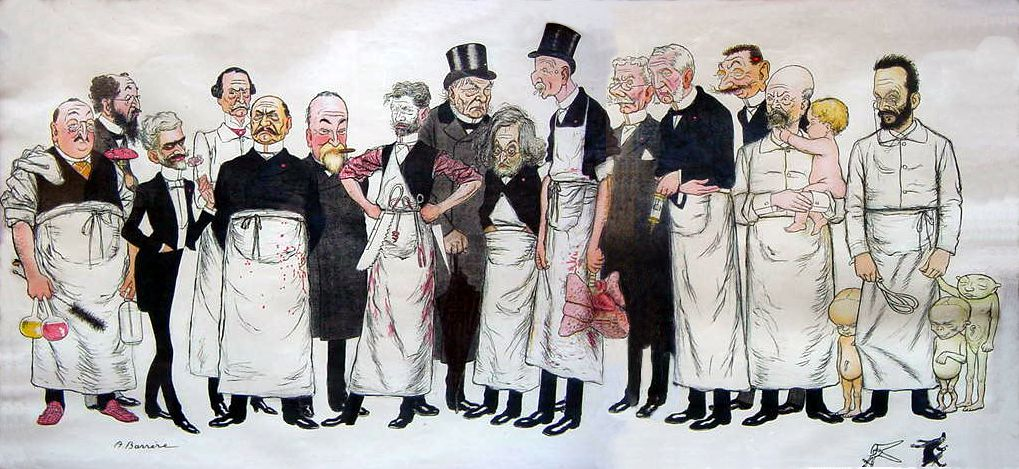
Members of the Paris Medical Faculty (1904), caricature by Adrien Barrère: André Chantemesse, Gabriel Pouchet, Paul Poirier (surgeon) (1853–1907), Paul Georges Dieulafoy, Georges Maurice Debove, Paul Brouardel, Samuel Jean de Pozzi, Paul Jules Tillaux, Georges Hayem, Victor André Cornil, Paul Berger, Jean Casimir Félix Guyon, Pierre-Emile Launois, Adolphe Pinard and Pierre-Constant Budin

- De la tuberculisation des organes génitaux de la femme, thèse de médecine, 1865.
- Compte rendu des travaux de la Société anatomique de Paris, 1865.
- De l'exercice et de l'enseignement de la médecine, 1873.
- Eloge de M. Félix Bricheteau, lu à la Société anatomique, 1874.
- Accidents causés par les substances alimentaires d'origine animale contenant des alcaloïdes toxiques, 1889.
- Recherches expérimentales sur la mort par submersion brusque, 1889.
- La Vaccination Obligatoire et la Prophylaxis de la Variole Discours à l'Académie de médecine, 1891.
- Rôle du médecin dans les cas où la communication d'une maladie vénérienne est invoquée pour obtenir la séparation de corps ou le divorce, 1900.
- Accidents causés par l'addition des antiseptiques aux aliments, 1903.
- La nouvelle Loi sur la Santé Publique, 1904.
- Le voisinage d'un établissement dans lequel on soigne des tuberculeux constitue-t-il un danger, 1906.
- Les attentats aux moeurs, 1906.
