= Adrien Barrère =

French painter

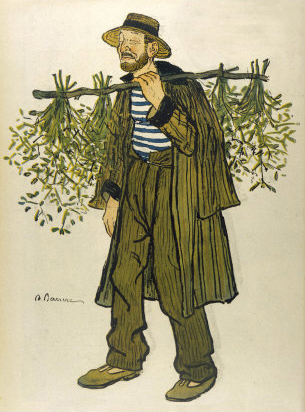
The Mistletoe Seller

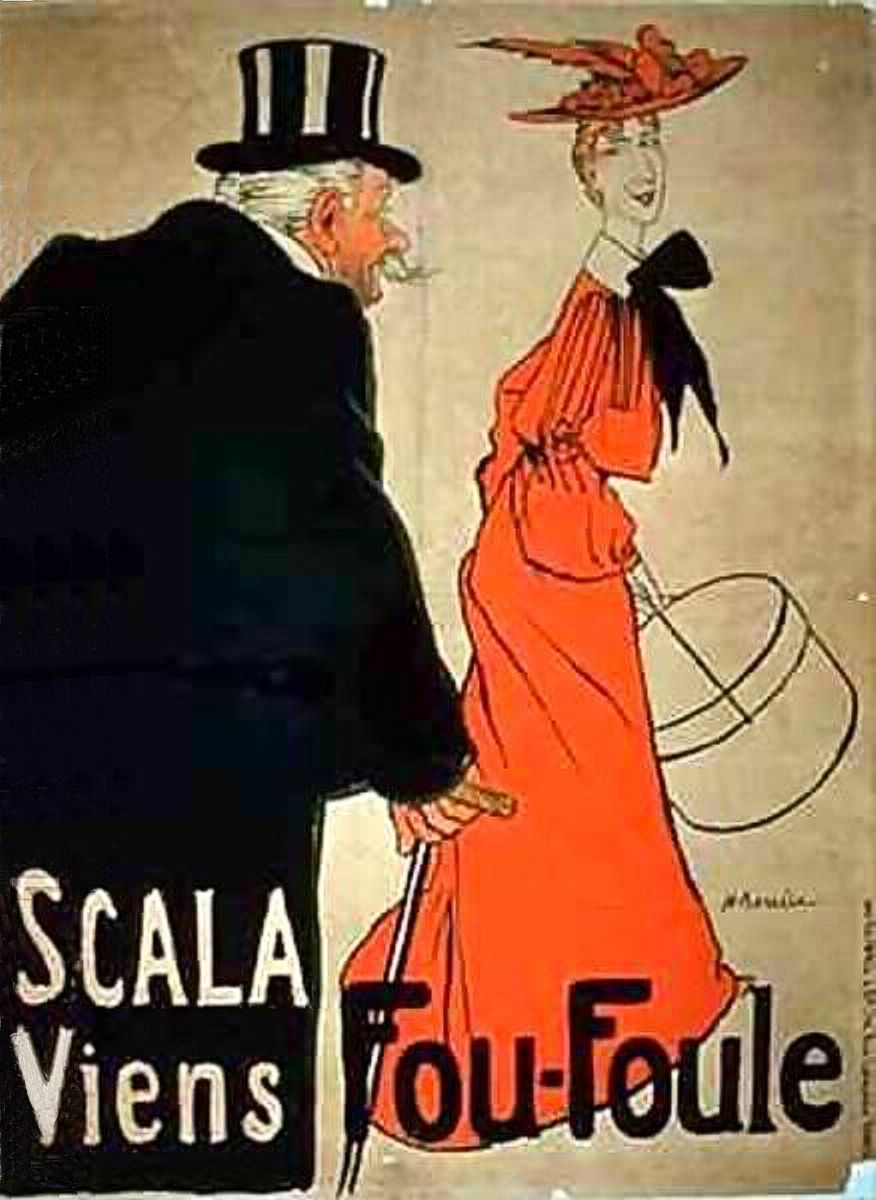

Adrien Barrère (baptised 'Adrien Baneux') (1874 Paris – 1931 Paris), was a French poster artist and painter, active in Paris during the Belle Époque.

After studying the law and medicine, Barrère turned to illustrating and particularly to the art of caricature, also designing a large number of posters for Parisian cinemas and Grand Guignol. His poster with caricatures of the Paris Medical Faculty, the original of which is held at University of Rouen and twice the size (72 x 116 cm; 28¼" x 45¾") of later copies, was immensely popular - no medical student left without a copy - and 420 000 copies were printed.

His collaboration with Pathé was particularly successful, including a famous poster titled "Tous y mènent leurs enfants". In 1912, Le Courrier Cinématographique, a corporate journal, described him as 'Pathé's man of the hour and designer of more than two hundred posters of unfettered verve and imagination'.

Barrère chronicled and caricatured performers of the Paris stage, adopting a kindlier approach than that of Toulouse-Lautrec.

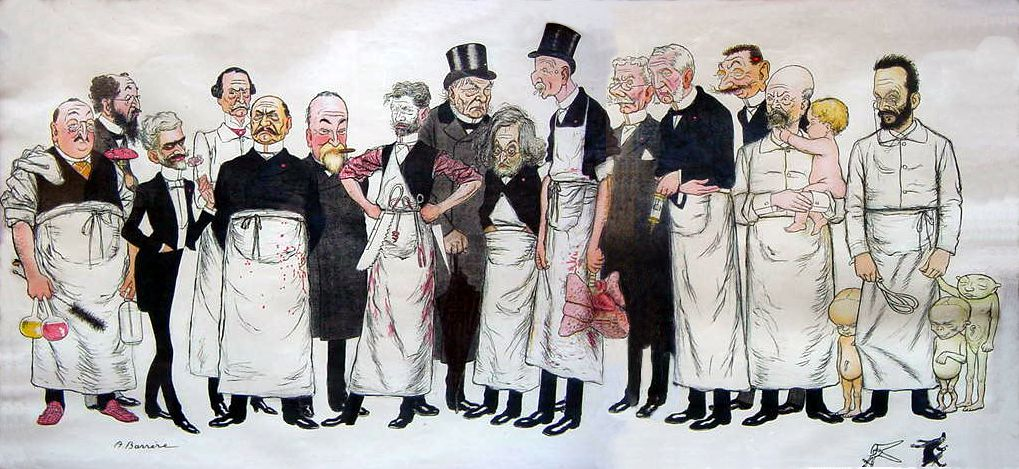
Members of the Paris Medical Faculty (1904), caricature by Adrien Barrère: André Chantemesse (1851–1919) Georges Pouchet (1833–1894) Paul Poirier (1853–1907) Paul Georges Dieulafoy (1839–1911) Georges Maurice Debove (1845–1920) Paul Brouardel (1837–1906) Samuel Jean de Pozzi (1846–1918) Paul Jules Tillaux (1834–1904) Georges Hayem (1841–1933) Victor André Cornil (1837–1908) Paul Berger (1845–1908) Jean Casimir Félix Guyon (1831–1920) Pierre-Emile Launois (1856–1914) Adolphe Pinard (1844–1934) Pierre-Constant Budin (1846–1907)
