= Victor André Cornil =

French pathologist, histologist and politician

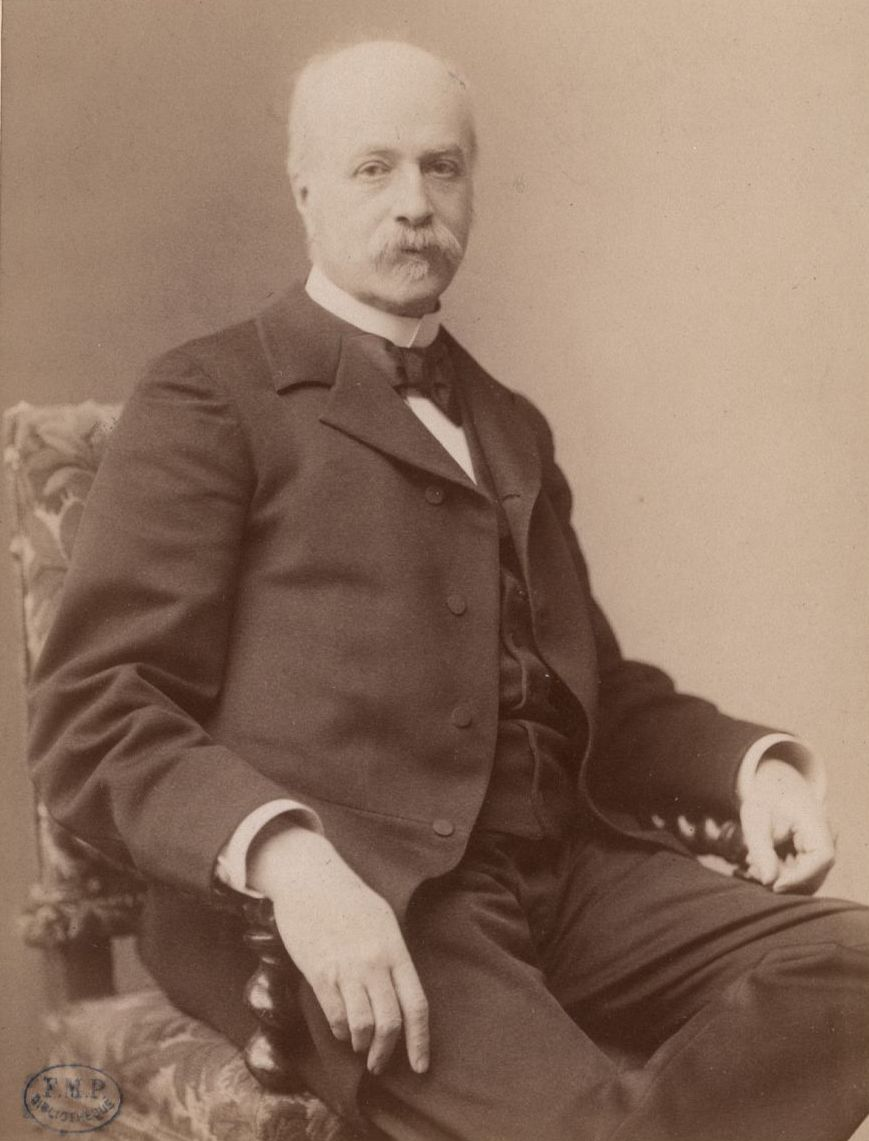
André-Victor Cornil (1837-1908)

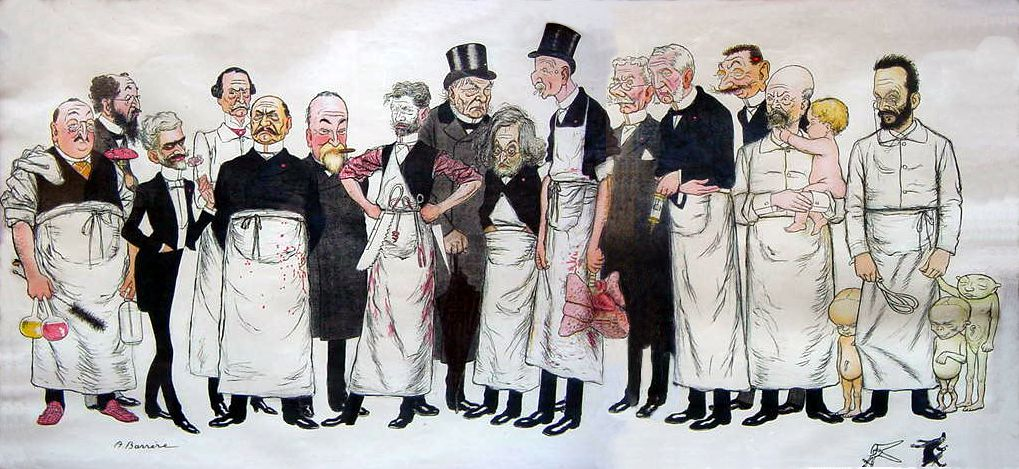
Members of the Paris Medical Faculty (1904), caricature by Adrien Barrère: André Chantemesse (1851–1919) Georges Pouchet (1833–1894) Paul Poirier (1853–1907) Paul Georges Dieulafoy (1839–1911) Georges Maurice Debove (1845–1920) Paul Brouardel (1837–1906) Samuel Jean de Pozzi (1846–1918) Paul Jules Tillaux (1834–1904) Georges Hayem (1841–1933) Victor André Cornil (1837–1908) Paul Berger (1845–1908) Jean Casimir Félix Guyon (1831–1920) Pierre-Emile Launois (1856–1914) Adolphe Pinard (1844–1934) Pierre-Constant Budin (1846–1907)

Victor André Cornil, also André-Victor Cornil (17 June 1837 – 13 April 1908) was a French pathologist, histologist and politician born in Cusset, Allier.

== Biography ==
He studied medicine in Paris, earning his doctorate in 1864. In 1869 he became professeur agrègé to the Paris faculty, and in 1884 a member of the Académie Nationale de Médecine. Cornil was elected a member of the Royal Swedish Academy of Sciences in 1902.

Cornil specialized in pathological anatomy, and made important contributions in the fields of bacteriology, histology and microscopic anatomy. In 1863 Cornil demonstrated histological evidence that supported Guillaume Duchenne's hypothesis regarding the cause of paralysis in poliomyelitis. With Austrian anatomist Richard Heschl (1824–1881) and Rudolph Jürgens of Berlin, he was among the first to use methyl violet as an histological stain for detection of amyloid. In 1864 he was the first physician to describe chronic childhood arthritis, a disorder that would later become known as Still's disease (named after English physician George Frederic Still 1868–1941).

In 1865 with Louis-Antoine Ranvier (1835–1922), he founded a private laboratory. Here Cornil taught pathological anatomy and Ranvier gave classes in standard anatomy. With Victor Babeș (1854–1926), he wrote an important paper on bacterial infections titled Les bactéries et leur rôle dans l’anatomie et l’histologie pathologiques des maladies infectieuses, and with Ranvier, he published an influential manual of histopathology called Manuel d'histologie pathologique.

He was elected to the Chamber of Deputies in 1876, serving until 1882. In 1885 Cornil was elected a senator and served until 1903.

== Selected written works ==
- Contribution à l'histoire du développement histologique des tumeurs épithéliales (1866).
- De la phtisie pulmonaire, étude anatomique, pathologique et clinique (Paris, 1867).
- Du cancer et de ses caractères anatomiques (1867).
- Manuel d'histologie pathologique (1869–76 with Louis-Antoine Ranvier, second edition 1881).
- Leçons élémentaires d'hygiène (1872).
- Leçons sur la syphilis, faites à l'hôpital de la Lourcine (1879).
- Les bactéries et leur rôle dans l'anatomie et l'histologie pathologique des maladies infectieuses (with Victor Babeș).
- Études sur la pathologie du rein (with Albert Brault).

== See also ==
- A Clinical Lesson at the Salpêtrière – 1887 group tableau portrait by André Brouillet
