= Tillaux =

Tillaux may refer to:

- Paul Jules Tillaux (1834–1904), French surgeon
- Tillaux-Chaput avulsion fracture
- Tillaux's triad
