= Bazy =

Bazy may refer to:

- Pierre Bazy (28 March 1853 - 22 January 1934), French physician
- Bazy Tankersley (March 7, 1921 – February 5, 2013), newspaper publisher and Arabian horse breeder
