= Raoul Bensaude =

French-Portuguese physician

Raoul Bensaude (26 January 1866 – 25 October 1938) was a French-Portuguese physician born in the Azores of Portuguese-Jewish descent.

He became a famous gastroenterologist that pioneered proctology in France. With Pierre-Emile Launois (1856–1914), he provided a detailed description of multiple symmetrical lipomatosis, also referred to as "Launois-Bensaude syndrome".

Raoul Bensaude went to school in Germany near Hannover and moved to Paris to study medicine. His doctoral thesis under supervision of Emile Charles Achard (1860-1944) was noticed as the first characterization of the bacillus, Salmonella paratyphi B causing paratyphoid fever. Bensaude then moved to Hôpital Saint-Antoine in Paris, where he was patronized by Georges Hayem (1841–1933) and finished his career as chef de service.

Bensaude made multiple contributions in the field of gastroenterology. Thanks to Lucius Littauer, an American philanthropist, he founded at Hôpital Saint-Antoine the first service of proctology in France. He is credited for popularizing sclerotherapy for treatment of hemorrhoids, and developed a model of rectoscope named after him. His treatise Rectoscopie: Sigmoïdoscopie. Traité d'endoscopie recto-colique had a worldwide impact.

== Works ==
- Raoul Bensaude, Le phénomène de l’agglutination des microbes et ses applications à la pathologie (Le sérodiagnostic) Thèse, Paris 1897. - The phenomenon of agglutination of microbes and its applications to pathology (serology).
- Georges Hayem, Leçons sur les maladies du sang recueillies par É. Parmentier et R. Bensaude. Masson, Paris 1900. - Lectures on diseases of the blood collected by Parmentier & Bensaude.
- Raoul Bensaude, Pierre Hillemand, André Lambling, et Roger Cattan. Rectoscopie: Sigmoïdoscopie. Traité d'endoscopie recto-colique. Masson et Cie, Paris 1919, 1926. "Ouvrage couronné par l'Académie de médecine." - Rectoscopy: sigmoidoscopy. treatise on colonic endoscopy.
- Raoul Bensaude Traité des maladies de l’intestin vol.I, Masson Paris, 1931. - treatise on diseases of the intestine.
- Raoul Bensaude Traité des maladies de l’intestin vol.II, Masson Paris, 1932.
- Raoul Bensaude Traité des maladies de l’intestin vol.III, Masson Paris, 1935.
- Raoul Bensaude Maladies de l'intestin vol. IV. Les hémorroïdes et leur traitement, fissure anale, prurit anal, etc. Masson Paris, 1939. - Diseases of the intestine, Volume IV. Hemorrhoids and their treatment, anal fissures, pruritus ani, etc.

== Bibliography ==
- Richard Kohn (2003) pp278–279 in L’activité scientifique des médecins juifs en France depuis 1789 dans Mélanges d’histoires de la médecine hébraïque. Etudes choisies de la Revue d’Histoire de la Médecine Hébraïque (1948-1985). Gad Freudenthal, Samuel S Kottek eds., Leyde, BRILL Academic Publishers.
- Martin J. Synnott (1936) Raoul Bensaude of Paris in American Journal of Digestive Disease and Nutrition Volume 3, Number 4, pp262–267.
