= Mesenteric cyst =

Type of tumor

A mesenteric cyst (MeSH C04.182.473) is a cyst in the mesenterium, and is one of the rarest abdominal tumors, with approximately 823 cases reported since 1507. The incidence is between 1 per 100,000 to 1 per 250,000 hospital admissions.

Tillaux's triad named after the French surgeon Paul Jules Tillaux can be seen in cases of mesenteric cyst. It consists of the following signs:

- a fluctuating swelling near the umbilicus
- freely mobile in the direction perpendicular to the attachment of mesentery
- on percussion: zone of resonance—i.e., band of bowel resonance (due to loop of bowel in front of cyst) and dull note behind due to fluid inside the cyst

It is basically of two types:

1. Chylolymphatic, the most common type: thin wall, lined by flat endothelium, clear chylous fluid present, separate blood vessels
2. Enterogenous: thick wall, lined by columnar, mucinous fluid present common blood supply

Treatments:

1. Chylolymphatic cyst: Enucleation
2. Enterogenous cyst: Excision of cyst along with resection and anastomosis of part of bowel that shares common blood supply with the cyst
