= Georges Henri Roger =

French physiologist

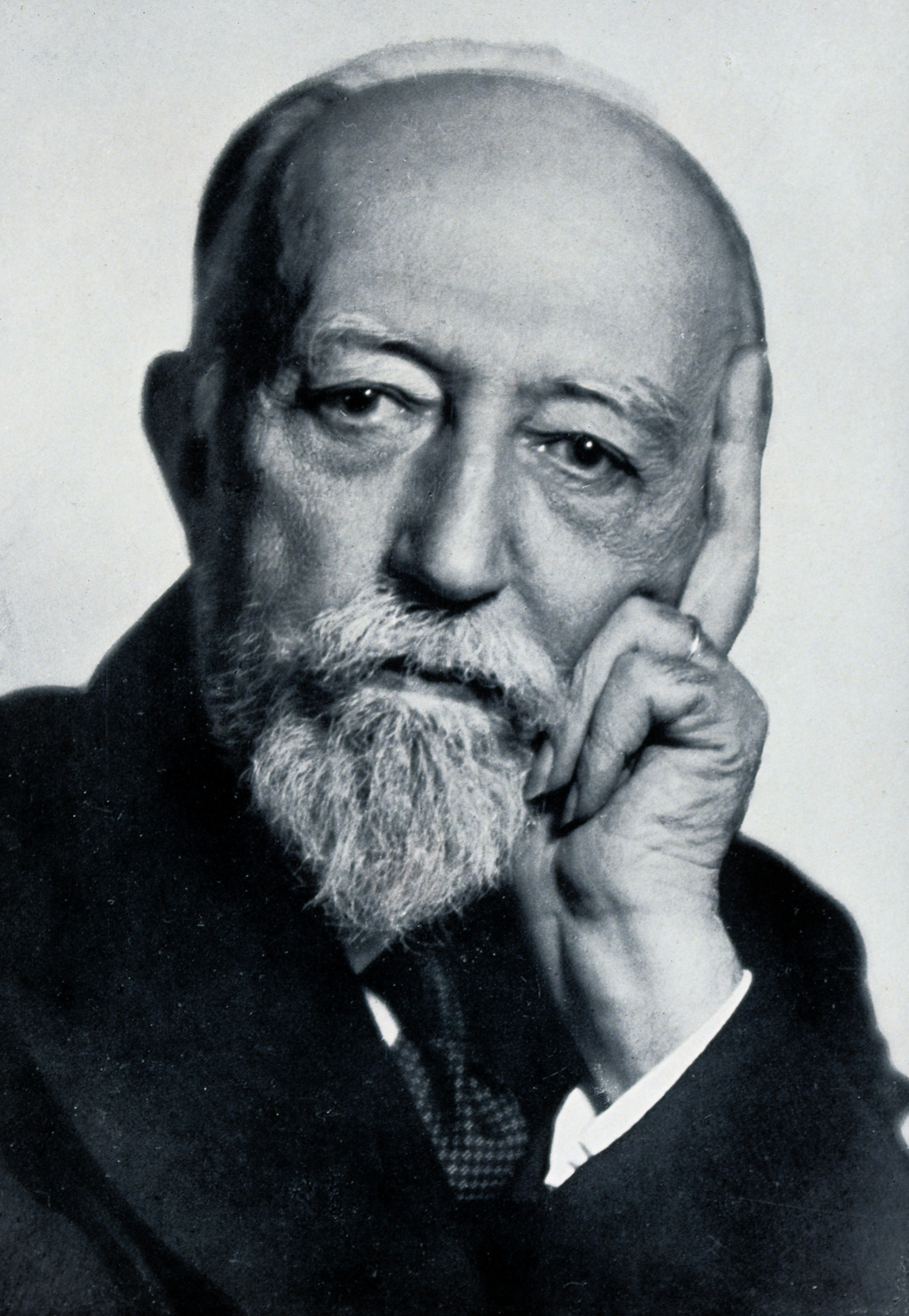
- Born: Georges Eugène Henri Roger; 4 June 1860; Paris, France
- Died: 19 April 1956 (aged 85); Saint-Leu-la-Forêt, France
- Education: University of Paris
- Scientific career
- Workplaces: University of Paris

Georges Eugène Henri Roger (4 June 1860 – 19 April 1946) was a French physiologist. He studied medicine at the University of Paris, where he later became a professor of experimental pathology and physiology. In 1930 he was appointed dean of the medical faculty.

In the field of experimental pathology, he performed research on cholelithiasis and hepatic disease. Among his written works were articles on diseases of the liver, gastro-intestinal tract and spinal cord. In addition, his 1897-98 lectures at the University of Paris were translated into English and published as Introduction to the Study of Medicine (1901).

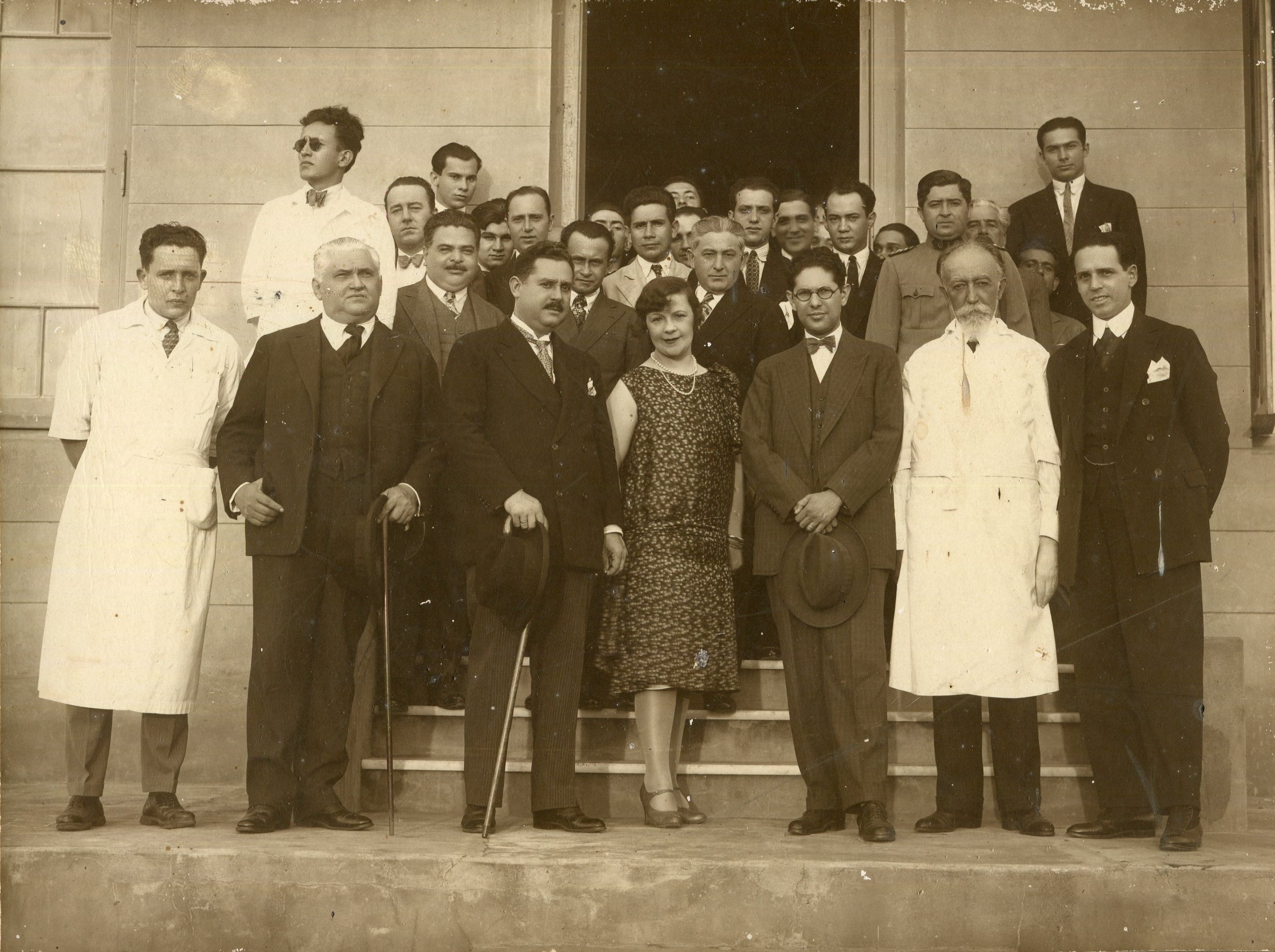
Dr. Roger in Asunción with medical students and professors, as well as President Guggiari, 1930.

With Georges-Fernand Widal (1862-1929) and Pierre Teissier (1864-1932), he was co-author of the 22-volume Nouveau traité de médecine (New Treatise of Medicine), which was a comprehensive French masterpiece of anatomy and pathology. His name is lent to the eponymous "Roger's reflex"; a term that is sometimes used to describe excessive salivation due to irritation of the lower part of the esophagus.
