= Pierre Bazy =

French surgeon & urologist (1853–1934)

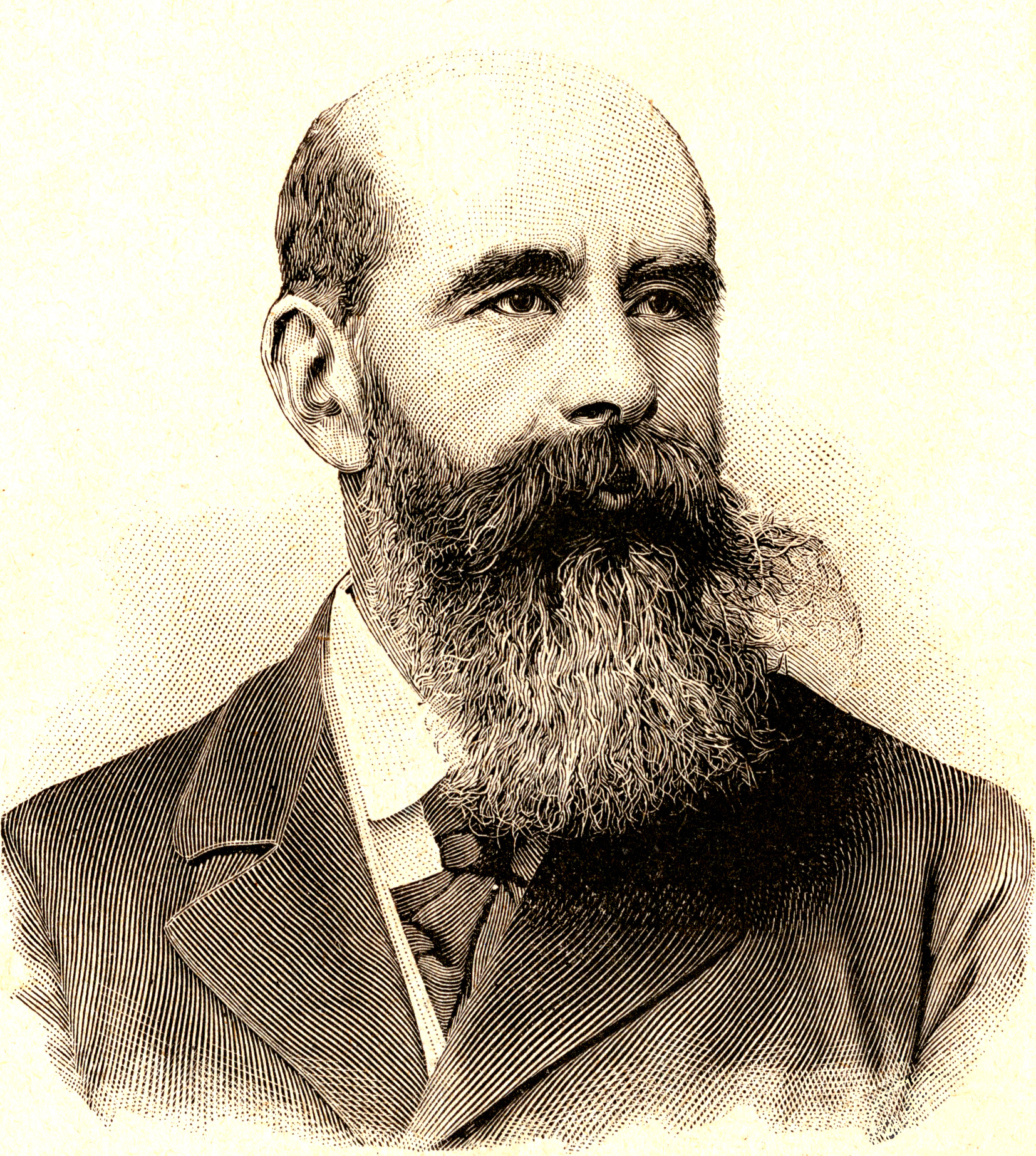
Pierre Bazy.

Pierre Bazy (28 March 1853 – 22 January 1934) was a French surgeon and urologist born in Sainte-Croix-Volvestre.

He studied medicine in Toulouse, afterwards serving as an interne at the Hôpital Lourcine in Paris. He successively worked at the Bicêtre, Hôpital Tenon and Hôpital Saint-Louis. At the Hôpital Beaujon he was appointed director of urology. Bazy was a member of the Académie de Médecine and the Académie des Sciences (1921).

A specialist in genitourinary medicine, he is credited with coining the term uretéro-cysto-néostomie (today known as ureteroneocystostomy) for surgery involving implantation of the upper end of a transected ureter into the bladder. Bazy was a proponent of preventive serotherapy for treatment of tetanus.

== Selected writings ==
- Atlas des maladies des voies urinaires, with Félix Guyon (1831–1920).
- De l'uretéro-cysto-néostomie (1894)
- Maladies des voies urinaires (1896–1901); multi-volume.
- Contribution à la chirurgie de l'uretère. De l'uretéro-pyélo-néostomie (1897)
- La Serotherapie dans le tetanos (1914)
- Urologie pratique, (second edition- 1930).
