= Tillaux fracture =

- Other names: Tillaux-Chaput avulsion fracture
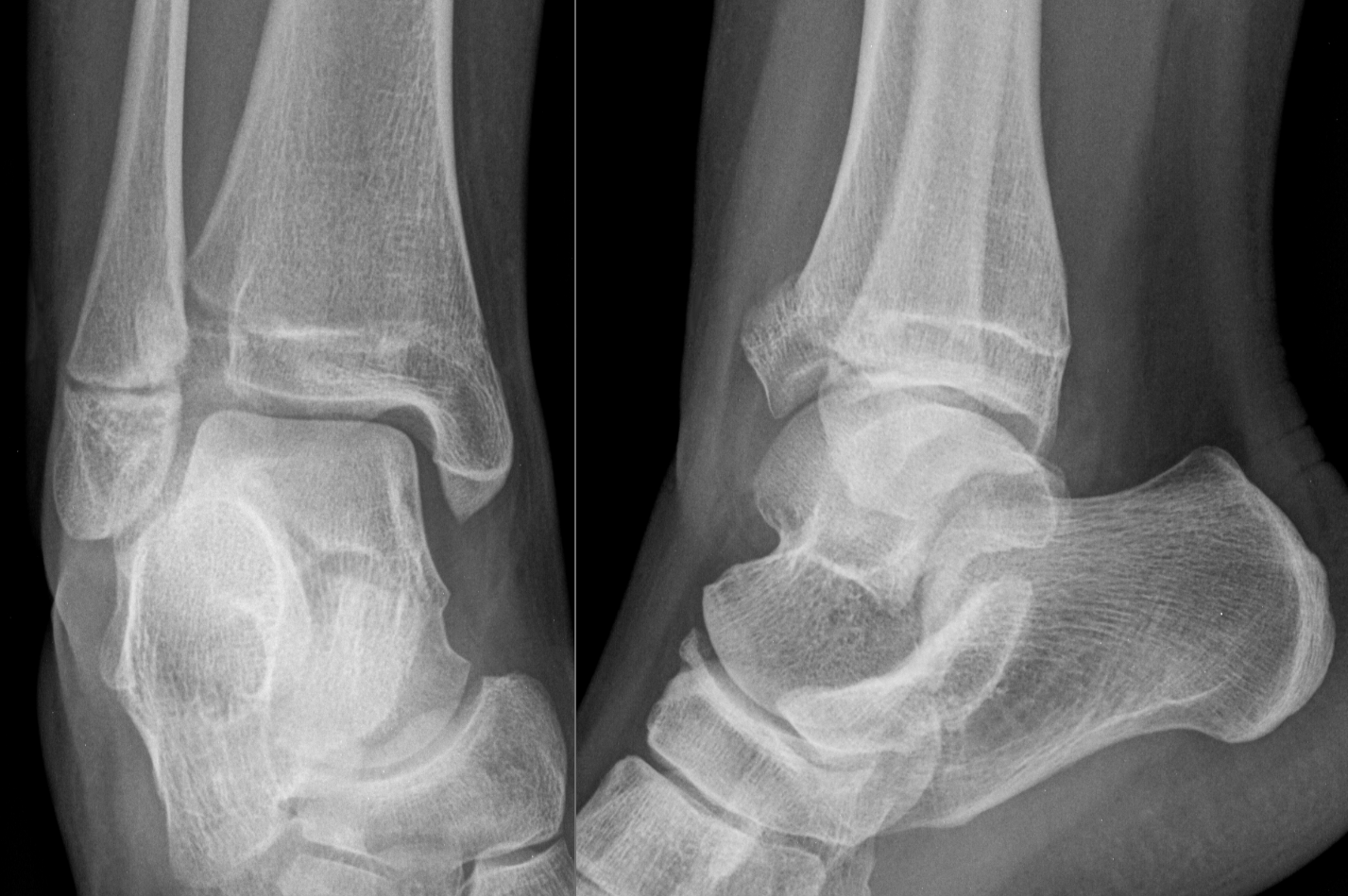
- X-ray of a Tillaux fracture in an 11 year old female
- Specialty: Orthopedic

A Tillaux fracture is a Salter–Harris type III fracture through the anterolateral aspect of the distal tibial epiphysis. It occurs in older adolescents between the ages of 12 and 15 when the medial epiphysis had closed but before the lateral side has done so, due to an avulsion of the anterior inferior tibiofibular ligament, at the opposite end to a Wagstaffe-Le Fort avulsion fracture

== Mechanism ==
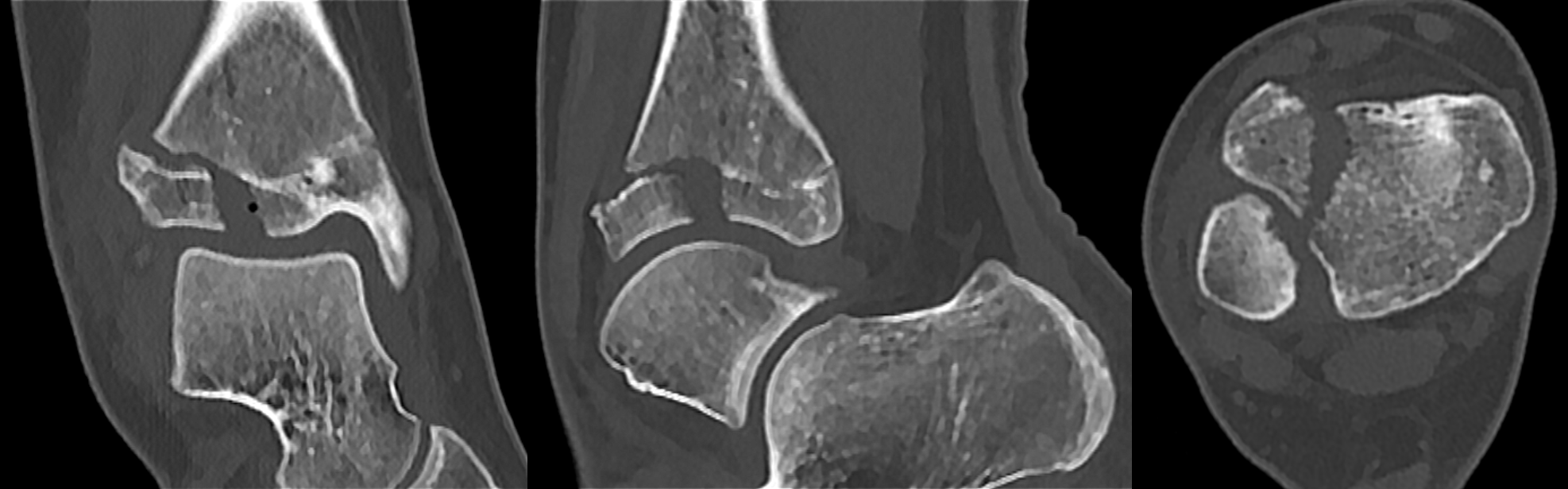
Same case on CT scan.

The fracture commonly results from an abduction-external rotation force, causing the anterior tibiofibular ligament to avulse the anterolateral corner of the distal tibial epiphysis resulting in a Salter Harris Type III fracture.

== Pathology ==
It occurs in older children at the end of growth. Variability in fracture pattern is due to progression of physeal closure as anterolateral part of distal tibial physis is the last to close. When the lateral physis is the only portion not fused, external rotation may lead to Tillaux or Triplane fractures.

== Treatment ==
If the displacement at fracture is less than 2 mm, it may be managed conservatively. However, displacement requires open reduction and internal fixation, especially when displacement is over 2 mm.

== Epidemiology ==
It occurs commonly in adolescents and older children. However, it does occur rarely in adults though it may be under reported because of difficulty in diagnosis.

== Etymology ==
This fracture pattern is named after Paul Jules Tillaux, a French Anatomist and Surgeon (1834-1904).

== See also ==
- Ankle fracture
