= Georges-Fernand Widal =

French physician

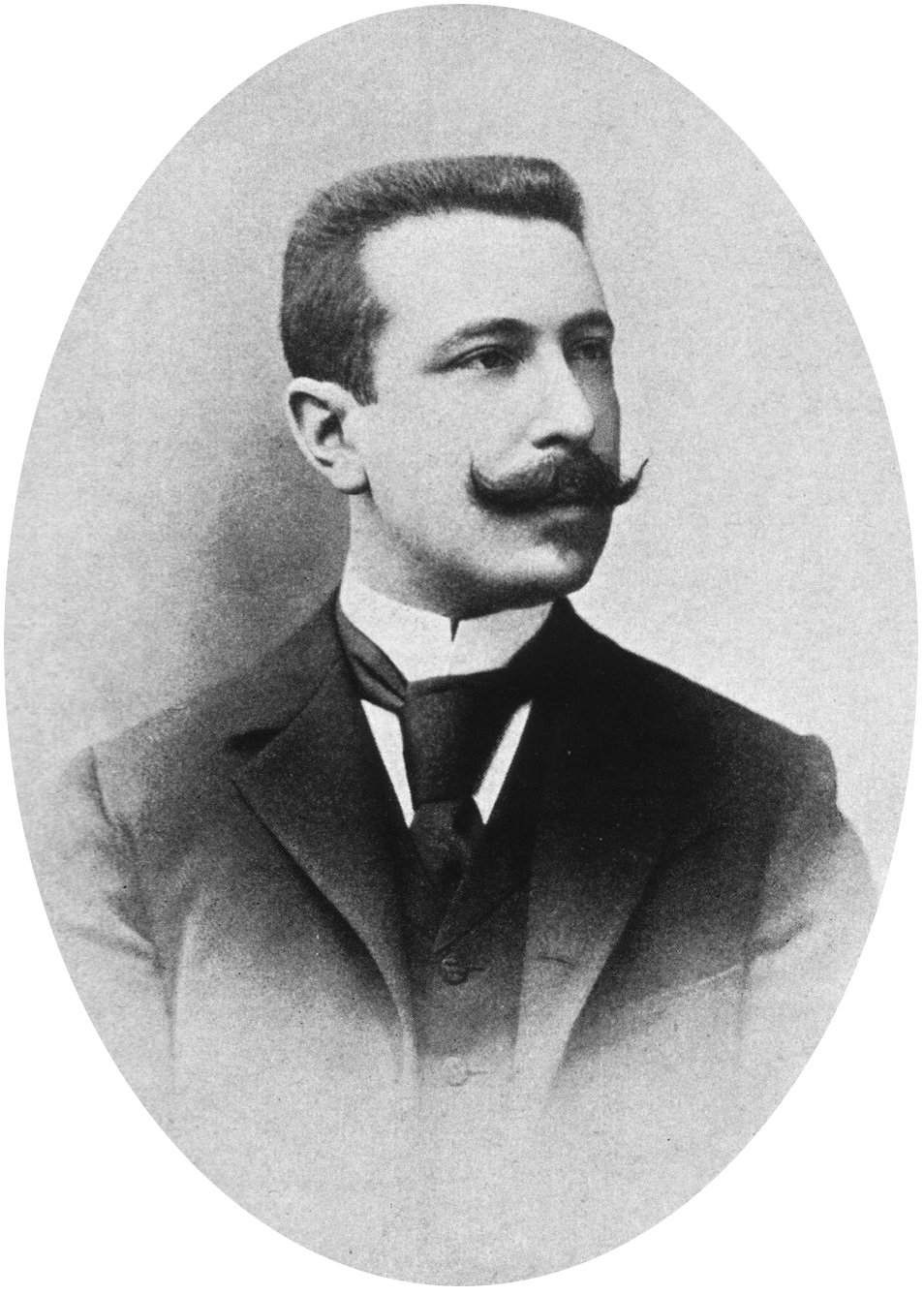

Georges-Fernand-Isidor Widal (March 9, 1862 in Dellys, Algeria – January 14, 1929 in Paris) was a French physician.

From 1886 to 1888 he devoted himself to public demonstrations of the researches of the faculty of pathological anatomy, and during the two years following was in charge of a course in bacteriology in the laboratory of Professor Victor André Cornil (1837–1908) in Paris. In 1895 he was appointed visiting physician to the hospitals of Paris, and in 1904 became an instructor in the faculty of medicine. In 1905 he became a physician to the Hôpital Cochin, and was in charge of the medical clinics at the same institution. During the WWI, he developed a vaccine against typhoid fever which reduced the spread of this disease in French army and more generally allied troops.

Widal was the author of a remarkable series of essays on infectious diseases, erysipelas, diseases of the heart, liver, nervous system, etc., besides being a prolific contributor to various medical journals and encyclopedias. His name is associated with the Widal test, a diagnostic test for typhoid fever, and with hematologist Georges Hayem (1841–1933), he described acquired haemolytic anaemia, a disease that was historically referred to as "Hayem–Widal syndrome".

== Literary works ==
- Etude sur l'infection puerpérale, 1889.
- La cure de déchloruration dans le mal de Bright, 1906.
- Maladies des veines et des lymphatiques, 1911.
- Nouveau traité de médicine, 22 Vols., 1923 (with Georges Henri Roger, Pierre Joseph Teissier).
