= Hôpital Tenon =

Coordinates: 48.8663567°N 2.4015104°E

- AP-HP
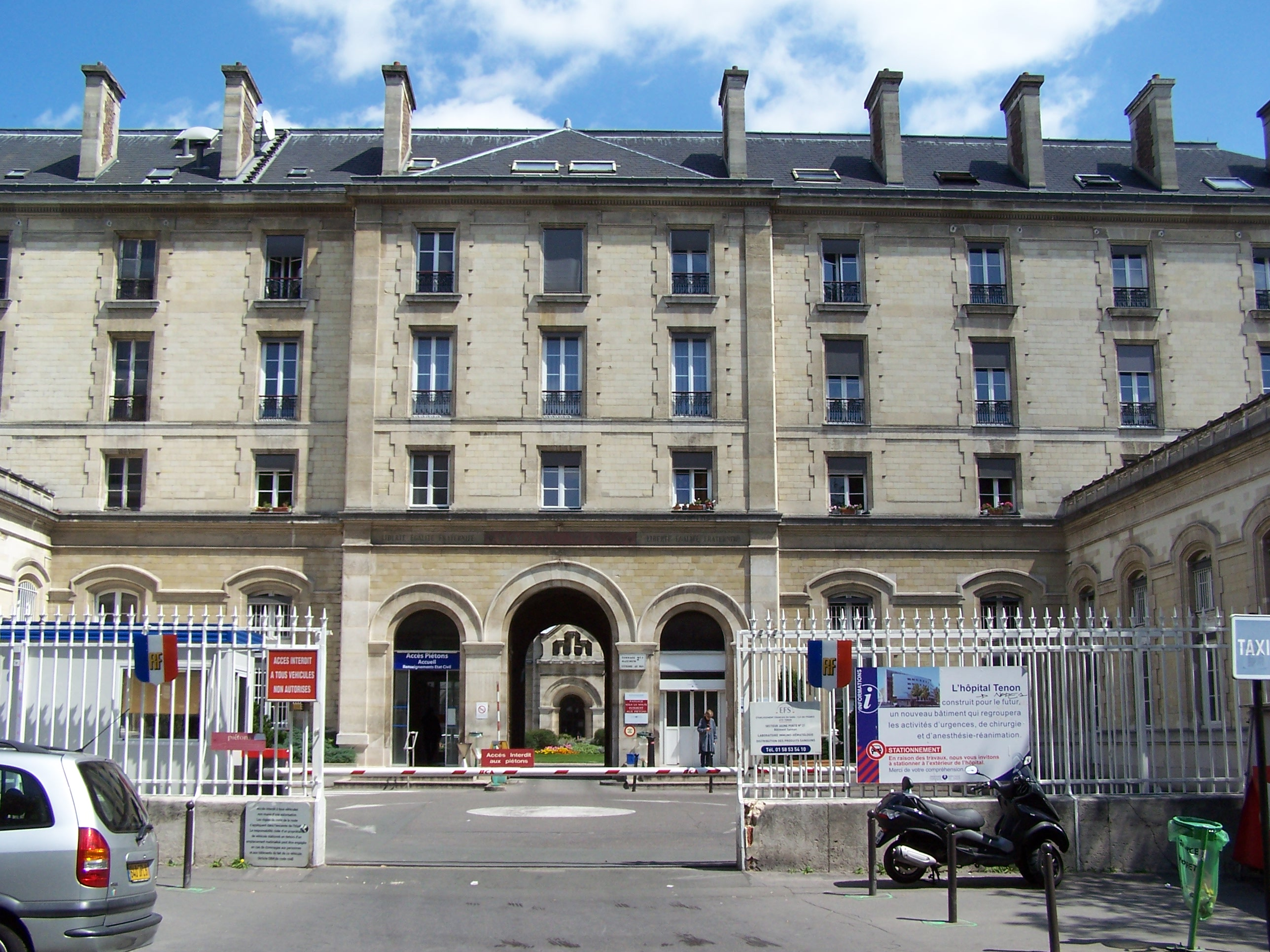
- Entrance of the Hôpital Tenon
- Location of the Hôpital Tenon within Paris

Geography
- Location: 4 Rue de la Chine, 75020 Paris, France

Organisation
- Care system: Public
- Type: Teaching

Services
- Emergency department: Yes

Links
- Website: https://tenon.aphp.fr
- Lists: Hospitals in France

Hôpital Tenon is a hospital located at 4, rue de la Chine in the 20th arrondissement of Paris. It is part of the Assistance Publique – Hôpitaux de Paris (AP-HP) and the university hospital group AP-HP-Sorbonne University. It is known for its services in the fields of urology, pneumology, gynecology, and interventional radiology. It is accredited by the Haute Autorité de santé.

The hospital bears the name of the surgeon Jacques-René Tenon (1724–1816).
