= Paul Berger (physician) =

French physician and surgeon

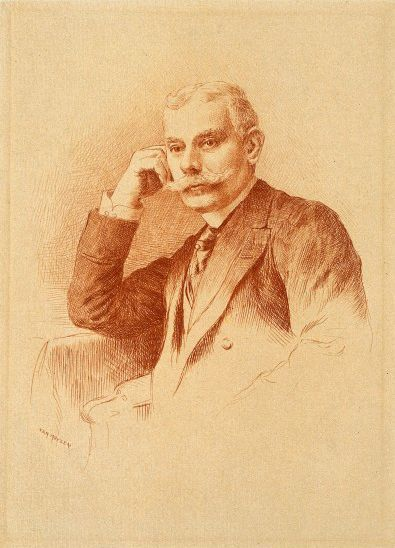
Paul Berger by Evert van Muyden

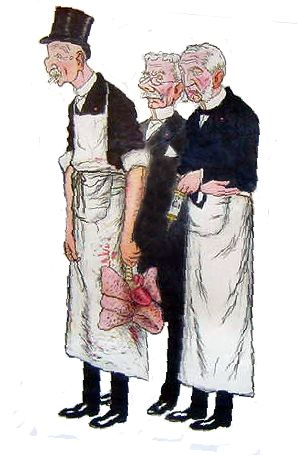
Caricature of Paul Berger flanked by two of his colleagues from the Faculté de médecine de Paris, Victor Cornil to left holding a pair of lungs, and Felix Guyon to right with a syringe by Adrien Barrère (1904)

Paul Berger (French pronunciation: [pɔl bɛʁ.ʒe]; 6 January 1845 Beaucourt, Territoire de Belfort – 1908) was a French physician and surgeon who practised in Paris at the Hôpital Tenon and was Professor of Clinical Surgery and Pathology at the Faculté de médecine de Paris. He is noted for Berger's operation, a method of interscapulothoracic amputation, and for improvements in hernia/intestinal suturing.

== Life ==
Berger was a French physician and surgeon who practised in Paris at the Hôpital Tenon and was Professor of Clinical Surgery and Pathology at the Faculté de médecine de Paris. He developed a method of interscapulothoracic amputation, called Berger's operation after him, and for improvements in hernia/intestinal suturing. He was the brother of Philippe Berger.

In October 1882 Berger amputated the whole upper limb of a patient with an enchondroma of the humerus, publishing a report the following year. In 1887 he published “L’Amputation du Membre Superieur dans la Contiguite du Tronc”, a detailed monograph on forequarter amputation. In the paper's historical review, Berger credited Ralph Cuming as the originator of the operation. Berger noted only two prior such operations for war injuries, by Cuming in 1808 and by Gaetani Bey in Cairo some thirty years later.

In 1889 a public display of aseptic instruments was held at the Exposition Universelle (1889) in Paris. Berger noted that
"it is impossible not to be struck by the complete transformation that surgical instrument making has undergone in the past few years. This renovation of our instrumentation was the consequence of the revolution that antisepsis introduced in surgical practice; it has been necessary to create entirely new equipment that meets and exceeds the conditions that surgeons consider essential." Berger drew special attention to the various designs for scissor-like articulations that French instrument makers had devised so that they could easily be disassembled for cleaning.

=== Surgical mask use ===
Berger began to don a surgical mask while operating in October 1897. He read a paper "On the Use of a Mask in Operating" before the Surgical Society of Paris on February 22, 1899. He began with the statement:

For several years I have been worried as to the part that drops of liquid projected from the mouth of the operator or his assistants may exercise on the outbreaks of infection which one still sees from time to time under conditions of surgical asepsis which are apparently satisfactory.

Berger had been alerted by some cases of suppuration after otherwise clean operations with an assistant suffering from an alveolar abscess. A similar situation arose some months later, when Berger himself was afflicted by dental periostitis. He also noticed drops of saliva projected from the surgeon or assistant when speaking. Conscious of Carl Flügge's discovery of pathogens in saliva, he determined to shield his operation incisions from this cause of contamination, and in October 1897 began to wear "a rectangular compress of six layers of gauze, sewn at its lower edge to his sterilized linen apron (he had a beard to safeguard) and the upper border held against the root of the nose by strings tied behind the neck." Over a period of fifteen months he became convinced that the incidence of infection had been reduced. He ended his paper with:

"It is exactly because I realize that perfection in the carrying out of operations aseptically must not concern itself with anv one point but with all, and must neglect no detail, that I have been so anxious to insist on a precaution, the use of which has contributed not a little to improve my operative results. I do not blind myself to the fact that this is too great a shock to custom for it to receive a much more favourable welcome than that accorded by the German surgeons to an analogous communication by Professor Mikulicz."

The notion of a surgeon's mouth being a rich source of infection was ridiculed, by a Monsieur Terrier scoffing that "I have never worn a mask, and quite certainly I never shall do so."

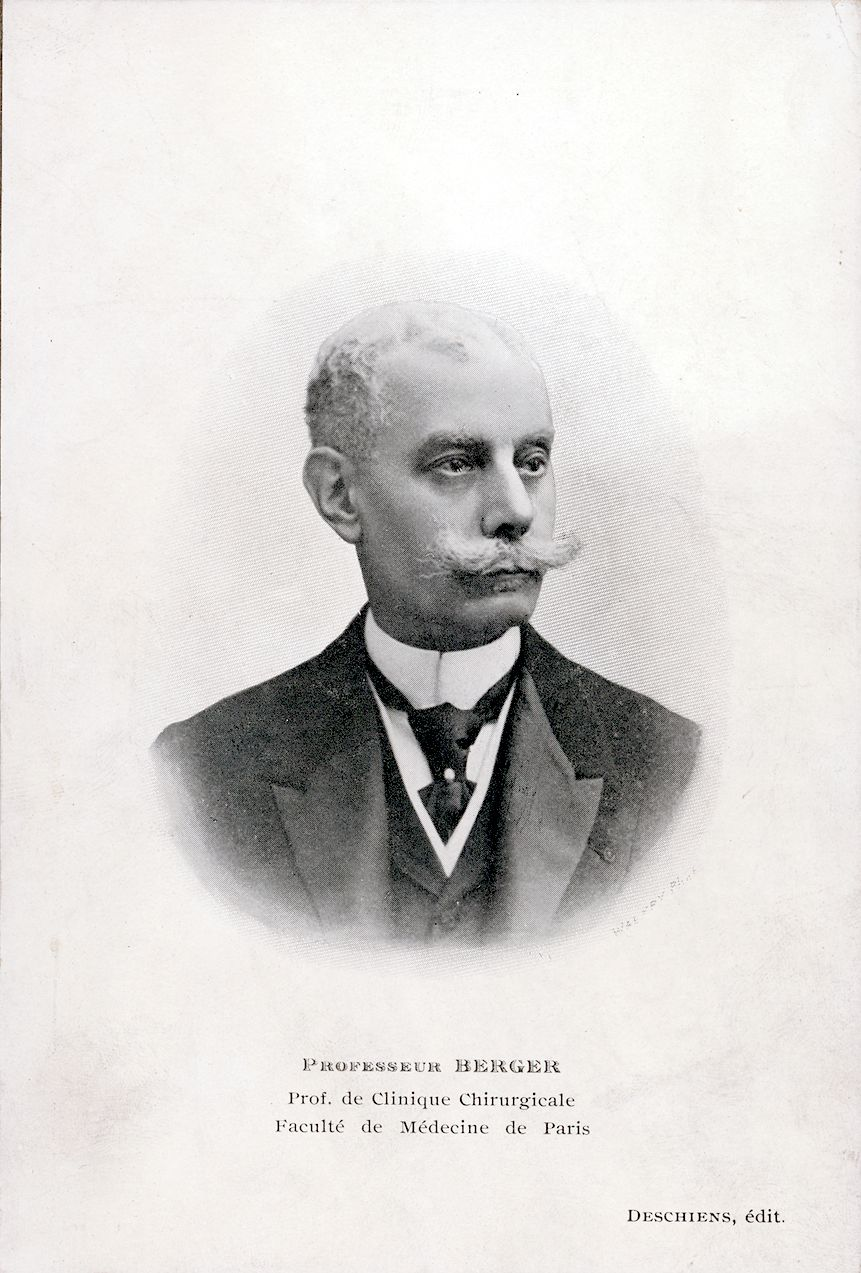

== Books ==
- "Chirurgie orthopédique" - Paul Berger, S. Banzet (Paris, 1904)
