= Georges Pouchet =

French naturalist and anatomist (1833–1894)

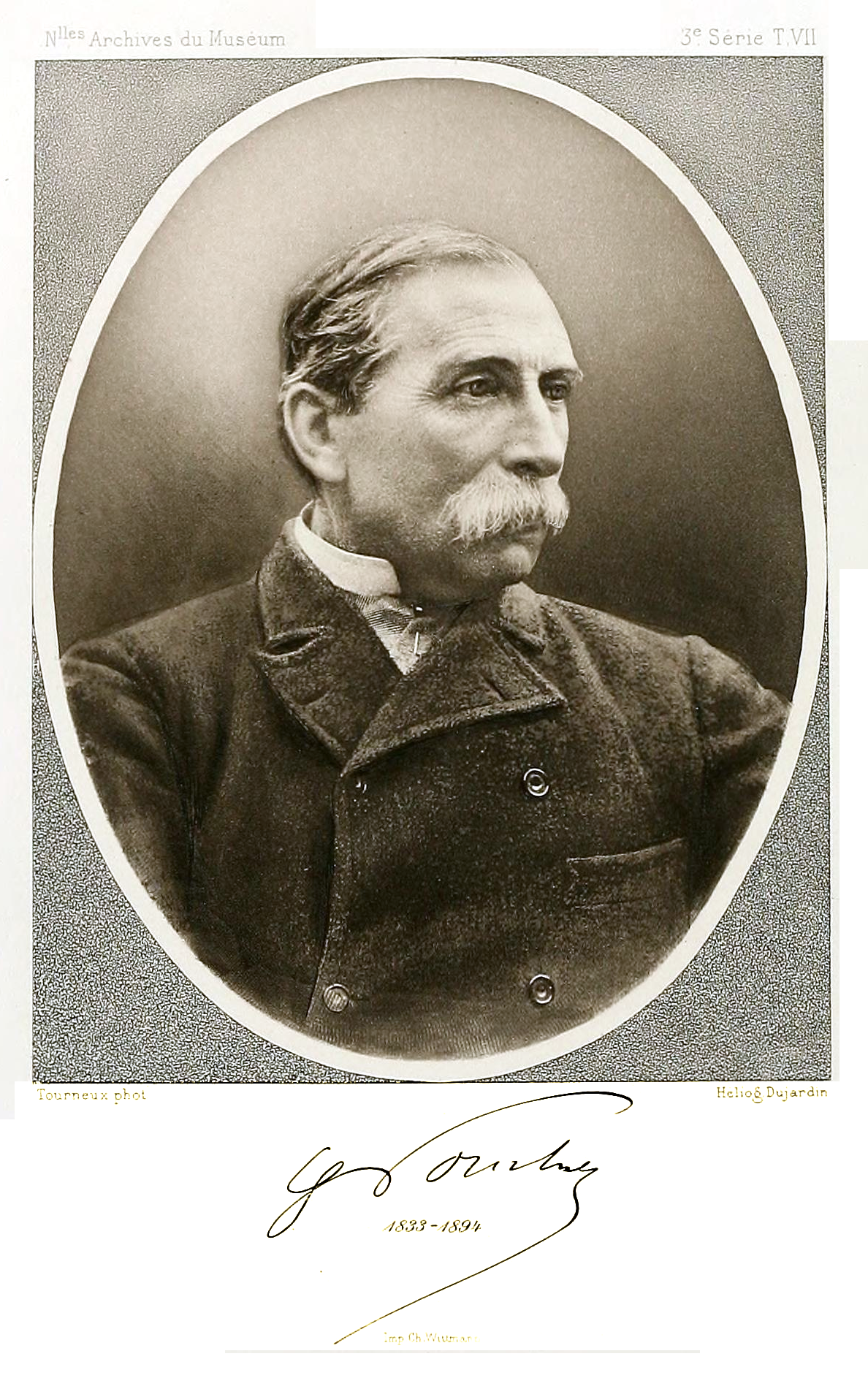
- Born: 26 February 1833
- Died: 29 March 1894 (aged 61)
- Scientific career
- Fields: Natural history, anatomy
- Thesis: De l'encéphale des édentés (1869)
- Author abbrev. (botany): C.H.G.Pouchet

Charles Henri Georges Pouchet (French: [ʒɔʁʒ puʃɛ]; 26 February 1833 – 29 March 1894) was a French naturalist and anatomist. He served as a professor of comparative anatomy in the Museum d'Histoire Naturelle. He was also involved in marine biology studies, with an interest in fisheries and cetaceans. He was also a writer of popular science content and interacted with French writers of the period.

== Life ==
Pouchet was born in Rouen, the son of naturalist and spontaneous generation supporter Félix Archimède Pouchet (1800–1872). He went to study at the Collège royal de la ville under Frédéric Preisser and learned natural history in the galleries of the museum alongside his father. From his mother he learned to speak English and was able to make contact with naturalists like Richard Owen. He became an assistant at the museum in 1851 and in 1855 he was specimen preparator at a school. In 1856 he was included on an expedition team by Ferdinand de Lesseps to seek the source of the Nile river under Count of Escayrac de Lauture. He was interested in anthropology and in 1864 he wrote a medical thesis on skin coloration. In 1856 he took part in an expedition to the Nile. In 1865 he became chief of anatomical work at the Muséum national d'histoire naturelle in Paris. He was dismissed on 18 March 1869 due to an article he wrote in L'Avenir national. In that article he wrote that the museum had ceased to be a place of pure sciences and that it had fallen prey to a cult of agriculture. He then went back to studies wrote a thesis in the natural sciences relating to memory and the brain. In 1870 he became interested in fish biology and began to study embryology and neurology in fish at the maritime laboratory at Concarneau. During the Franco-Prussian War he was posted as a physician in the army. After the war he began to offer courses on histology and became deputy director of the histology laboratory at the École des hautes études. At Concarneau he continued research on the coloration of fish and crustaceans. In 1875 he worked for Paul Bert handling physiology courses at the Sorbonne. In 1876 he became a lecturer at the École Normale Supérieure. In 1879 he succeeded Paul Gervais to the chair of comparative anatomy. From 1879 to 1894 he was professor of comparative anatomy at the Muséum national d'histoire naturelle. At the same time he managed the Concarneau laboratory along with Charles Robin. He became especially interested in the anatomy of cetaceans and visited Lisbon and the Azores in 1880. In 1881 he visited Lapland. Another interest was in the blood of animals. In 1892 he was part of an early scientific polar expedition to Svalbard and Jan Mayen.

== Works ==
Pouchet made contributions in several scientific fields, and specialised in comparative anatomy of fishes and whales. He was a prime advocate of polygenism, and was the author of an anthropological work titled De la Pluralité des races humaines (1858), which was translated into English as The Plurality of the Human Race in 1864 by the Anthropological Society. He took an interest in the history of biology and commented on the views of Aristotle. Pouchet was involved in popular science writing and edited scientific content for several periodicals including Le Siècle, La Revue des Deux Mondes, La Philosophie positiv, Le Temps and La Revue scientifique. He was a friend of Flaubert, Maupassant and Céard. Maupassant dedicated the short story La Mère sauvage to Pouchet in 1884.

=== Selected writings ===
- De la Pluralité des races humaines, 1858
- Journal de l’anatomie et de la physiologie (Journal of anatomy and physiology), with Charles-Philippe Robin (1821–1885), 1878
- Mémoire sur le grand fourmilier (Discourse on the giant anteater), 1874
- Precis d'histologie humaine et d'histogénie (Treatise of histology and human histogeny), with Frédéric Tourneux (1851–1922), 1878
- La Biologie aristotélique (Aristotelian biology), 1885
- Rapport sur le laboratoire de Concarneau (Report on the laboratory at Concarneau), 1888
- Traité d'ostéologie comparée (Treatise of comparative osteology), with H. Beauregard, 1889.
