= Adolphe Pinard =

French obstetrician (1844–1934)

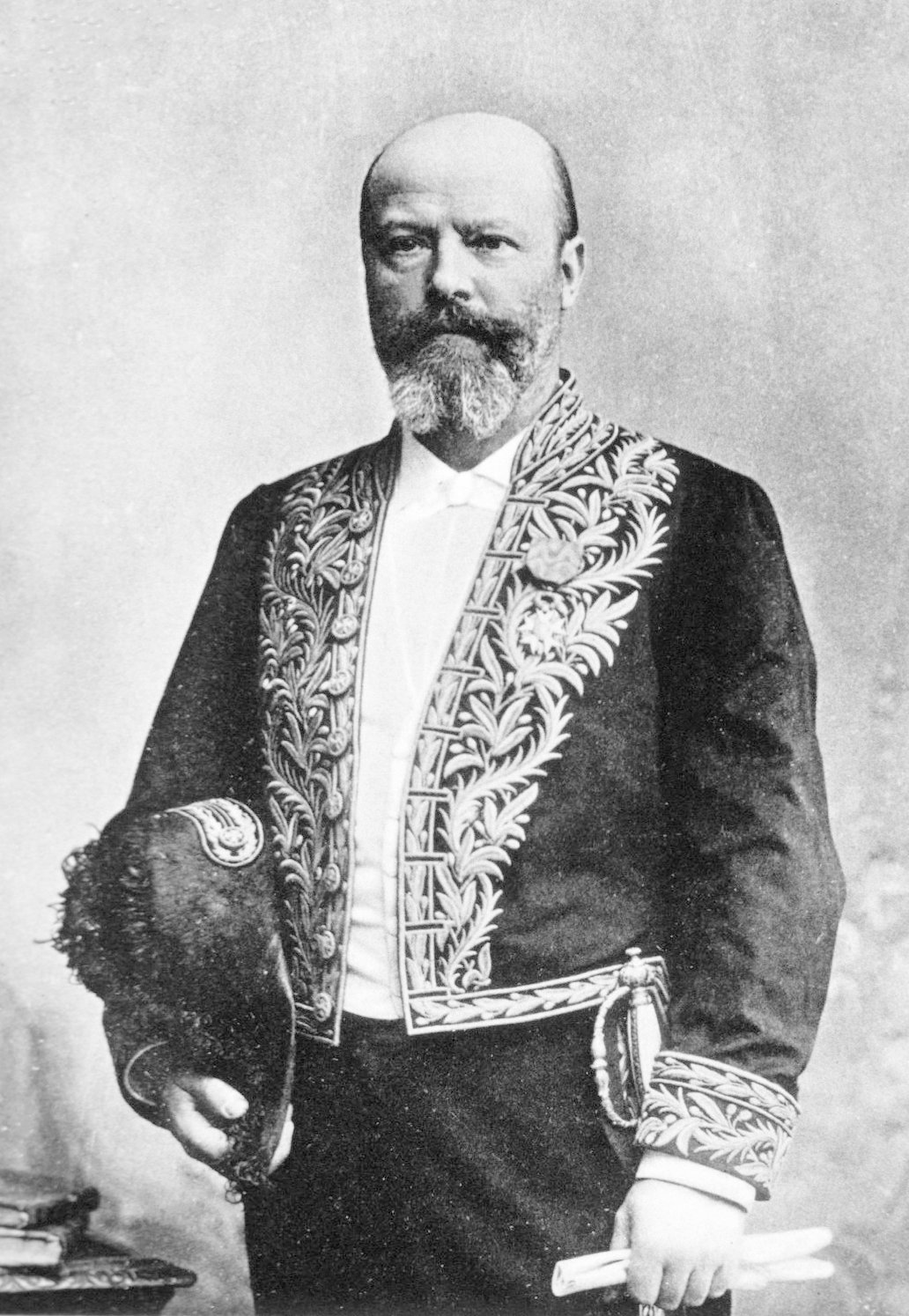
Adolphe Pinard

Adolphe Pinard (4 February 1844 – 1 March 1934) was a French obstetrician who was a native of Méry-sur-Seine. He practiced medicine in Paris, where he was an assistant to Étienne Stéphane Tarnier (1828–1897) and a professor of obstetrics, as well as a member of parliament for the Paris region.

== Career ==
Pinard was a pioneer of modern perinatal care and the "puericulture movement" — the teaching of infant care to expectant mothers in French obstetrics. He made a number of contributions in his work involving pre-natal and maternal health, and was an advocate of providing social care for pregnant women from deprived environments. He established abdominal obstetric palpation methods, and his name is associated with "Pinard's manoeuvre", a technique used in breech extraction.

In 1895 he invented a special stethoscope for listening to fetal activity. The device is sometimes reverently referred to as a "Pinard horn", or fetoscope (although fetoscope now refers to a fetal endoscope). Pinard horns are a safe and non-invasive tool used to listen to the fetal heart tones, and are still in use worldwide today, primarily by Midwives.

Pinard was a founder member of the French Eugenics Society in 1913 and served as its president. Eugenic ideas were incorporated into his idea of 'puériculture'. He also served as a parliamentary deputy for the Radical party between 1919 and 1928. As a deputy he argued for pro-natalist policies, but he was also sympathetic to and an influence on French feminism. In 1926 he introduced a law requiring future spouses to provide a pre-nuptial certificate of good health (attesting the absence of contagious diseases) before the marriage could be officially registered.

== Death and legacy ==
Pinard died on 1 March 1934 in Méry-sur-Seine. Today the Maternité Adolphe-Pinard in Nancy and the Boulevard Adolphe Pinard in Paris are named after him. This boulevard is a boundary between Paris and the city of Malakoff.

He received the Legion of Honour for his war work, and subsequently was made a Grand Officer of the Legion of Honour for his work in obstetrics.

== Writings ==
- Traité du palper abdominal, au point de vue obstétrical, et de la version par manœuvres externes, H. Lauwereyns, 1878 - Treatise on abdominal palpation, etc.
- Traitement de l'infection puerpérale (in collaboration with Victor Wallich), G. Steinheil, 1896 - Treatment of puerperal infection.
- Clinique obstétricale, Steinheil, 1899 - Obstetrical clinic.
- La puériculture du premier âge : nourriture, vêtement, hygiène, Colin, 1904 - Childcare in infancy: nourishment, clothing, hygiene.
- L'enseignement de la puériculture (in collaboration with Henri Méry), Impr. nationale, 1912 - Instruction in puericulture.

== Sources ==
- "Prof. Pinard Dies; Famous Physician". The New York Times. March 2, 1934. p. 19.
