= Georges Hayem =

French physician and hematologist

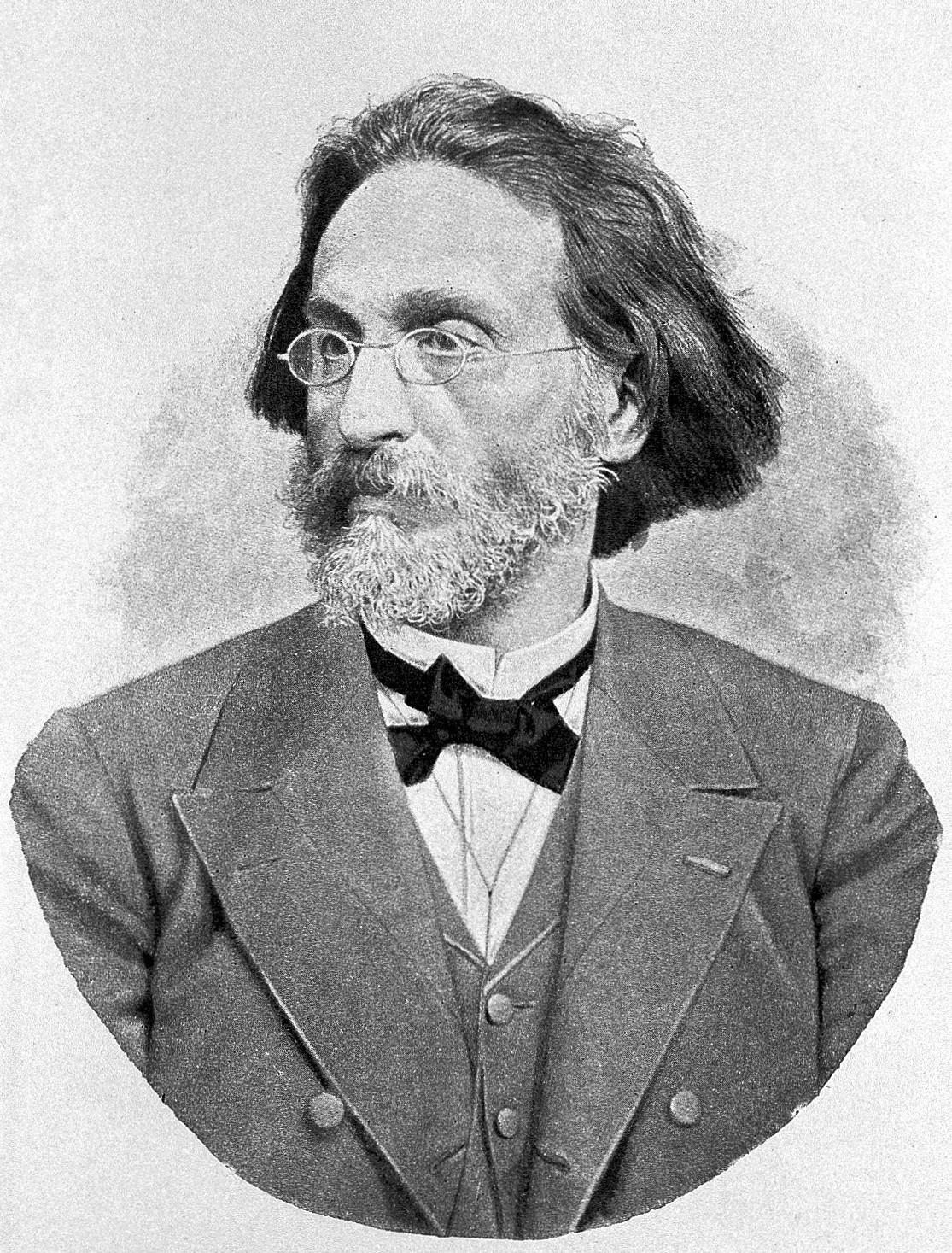
Georges Hayem.

Georges Hayem (25 November 1841 – 28 August 1933) was a physician and hematologist born in Paris.

He studied medicine in Paris, and later became a professor of therapy and materia medica. Beginning in 1878 he practiced medicine at the Hôpital Tenon; later on, he was associated with the Hôpital St. Antoine. From 1893 until 1911 he held the chair of clinical medicine.

Georges Hayem was a pioneer in the field of hematology, and is remembered for his studies on the formation of leukocytes and erythrocytes. He performed the first accurate count of blood platelets, and is credited with developing a solution of mercury bichloride, sodium chloride and sodium sulfate for dilution of blood prior to counting erythrocytes with a hemocytometer.

In 1874 he provided an early description of chronic interstitial hepatitis. With bacteriologist Georges-Fernand Widal (1862–1929), the eponymous "Hayem-Widal syndrome" is named, which is an historical term for acquired hemolytic anemia. Also, he introduced an intravenous solution of saline for treatment of Asiatic cholera.

In 1872 he founded the Revue des sciences médicales en France et à l’étranger.

== Principal writings ==
- Recherches sur l’évolution des hématies dans le sang de l’homme et des vertébrés. Archives de physiologie normale et pathologique, Paris, 1878, 5: 692–734. – First accurate counts of blood platelets.
- Traitement du choléra, G. Masson, Paris, 1885 – Treatment of cholera.
- Du sang et ses altérations anatomiques, G. Masson, Paris, 1889 – Anatomical changes in blood.
- Lecons cliniques sur les maladies du sang, G. Masson, Paris, 1900 – Clinical lessons on blood disorders.
- L’hématoblaste, troisième élément du sang, Paris, Presse univ. de France, 1923 – On hematoblasts.
