= Jean Casimir Félix Guyon =

French surgeon & urologist (1831–1920)

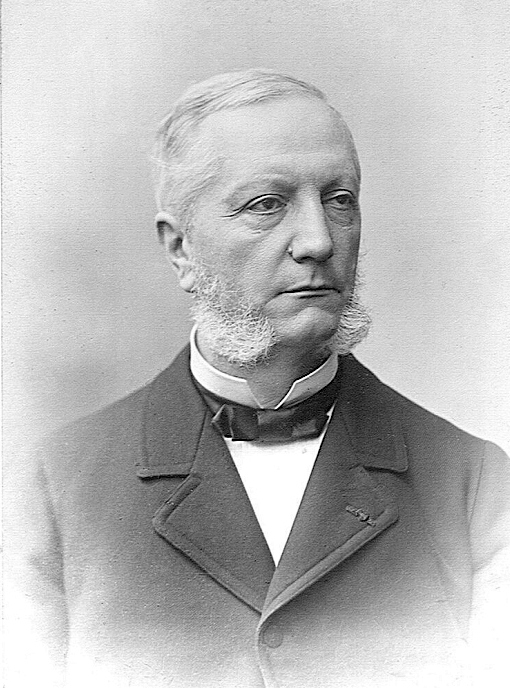
Jean Casimir Félix Guyon

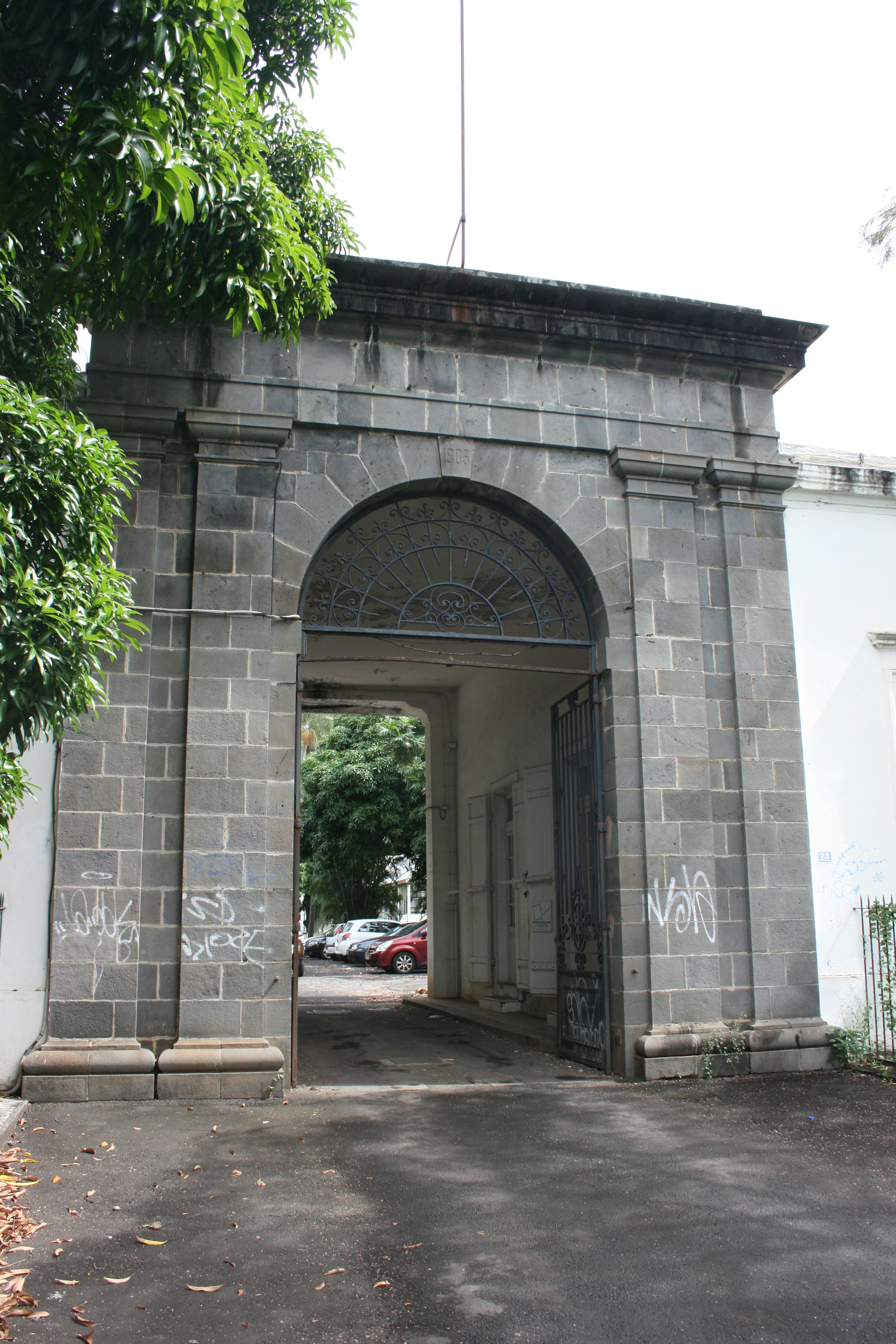
Hôpital Félix Guyon in Saint-Denis

Jean Casimir Félix Guyon (21 July 1831 – 2 August 1920) was a French surgeon and urologist born in Saint-Denis, Ile-Bourbon (Réunion).

He studied medicine in Paris, receiving his doctorate in 1858. He was appointed médecin des hôpitaux in 1864, and was later a professor of surgical pathology (from 1877) and genitourinary surgery (from 1890) at the University of Paris. In 1878 he became a member of the Académie de Médecine. At Hôpital Necker he held clinics that were attended by students worldwide

In 1907, he along with urologists from Europe, the United States and South America established the Association Internationale d'Urologie. In 1979 he was commemorated on a postage stamp, issued by France on the occasion of the 18th Congress of the Association Internationale d'Urologie, held in Paris. The Hôpital Félix Guyon, located in Saint-Denis, Réunion, is named in his honour.

Although he was primarily known for work with genitourinary anatomy, Guyon is credited with the discovery of the ulnar canal at the wrist. This canal channels blood vessels and the ulnar nerve from the forearm to the hand, and is now known as Guyon's canal. Ulnar nerve compression at this location is sometimes referred to as "Guyon's tunnel syndrome".

== Additional eponyms ==
- "Guyon's isthmus": an elongated constriction of the junction of the body and cervix.
- "Guyon's sign": ballottement of the kidney
- "Guyon's urethrotome": a variant of Maisonneuve's urethrotome.

== Œuvre écrite ==
- Sur les cavités de l'utérus à l'état de vacuité. Doctoral thesis; Paris, 1858.
- Des tumeurs fibreuses de l'utérus. Concours-thesis, 1860.
- Des vices de conformation de l'urèthre chez l'homme et les moyens d'y remédier. Concours-thesis, 1863.
- Éléments de chirurgie clinique, comprenant le diagnostic chirurgical, les opérations etc. Paris, 1873.
- Leçons cliniques sur les maladies des voies urinaires. Paris, J. B. Baillière, 1881; 2nd edition, 1885; 1084 pages. This book is based on his lectures at the Hôpital Necker in 1876 and 1877.
- Atlas des maladies des voies urinaires. Published with Pierre Bazy (1853–1934). Paris : Doin. Book 1–4, 1881–1883.
- Lecons sur les cystites et sur les prostatiques. 1888.
- Leçons cliniques sur les affections chirurgicales de la vessie et de la prostate. Paris, J. B. Baillière, 1888.
- Anatomie et physiologie pathologique de la rétention de l’urine. with Joaquín Albarrán (1860–1912). (1890).

== Honours ==
- Légion d'honneur:
  - Knight in 1868,
  - Officer in 1893,
  - Commander in 1906
- Officier d'Académie (Ordre des Palmes Académiques) in 1869
- Officier de l'Instruction Publique (Ordre des Palmes Académiques) in 1880
