= Paul Jules Tillaux =

French physician

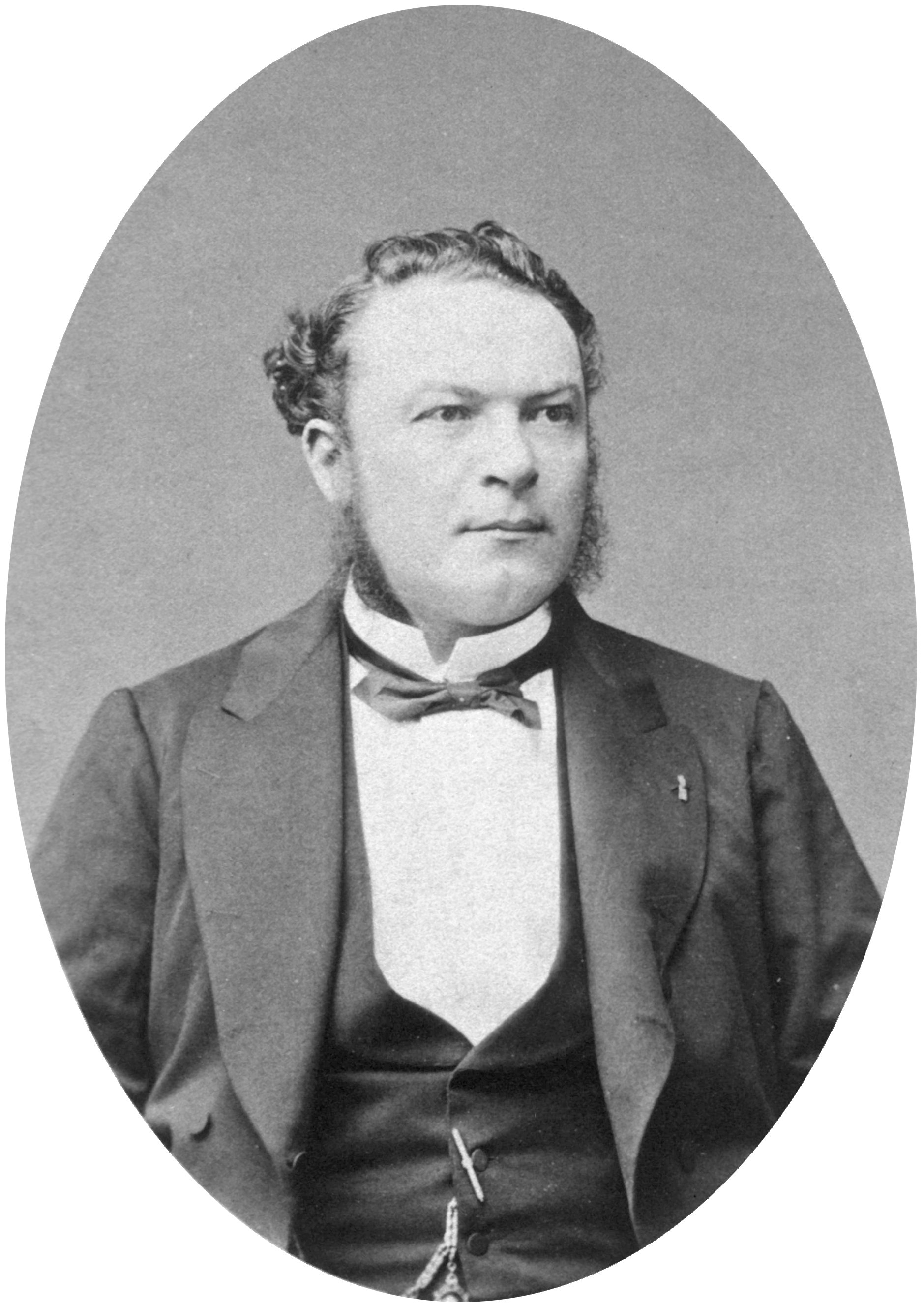
- Paul Jules Tillaux
- Born: 8 December 1834; Aunay-sur-Odon
- Died: 20 October 1904 (aged 69); Paris
- Resting place: Père Lachaise Cemetery
- Education: Académie de Médecine
- Occupation: Physician

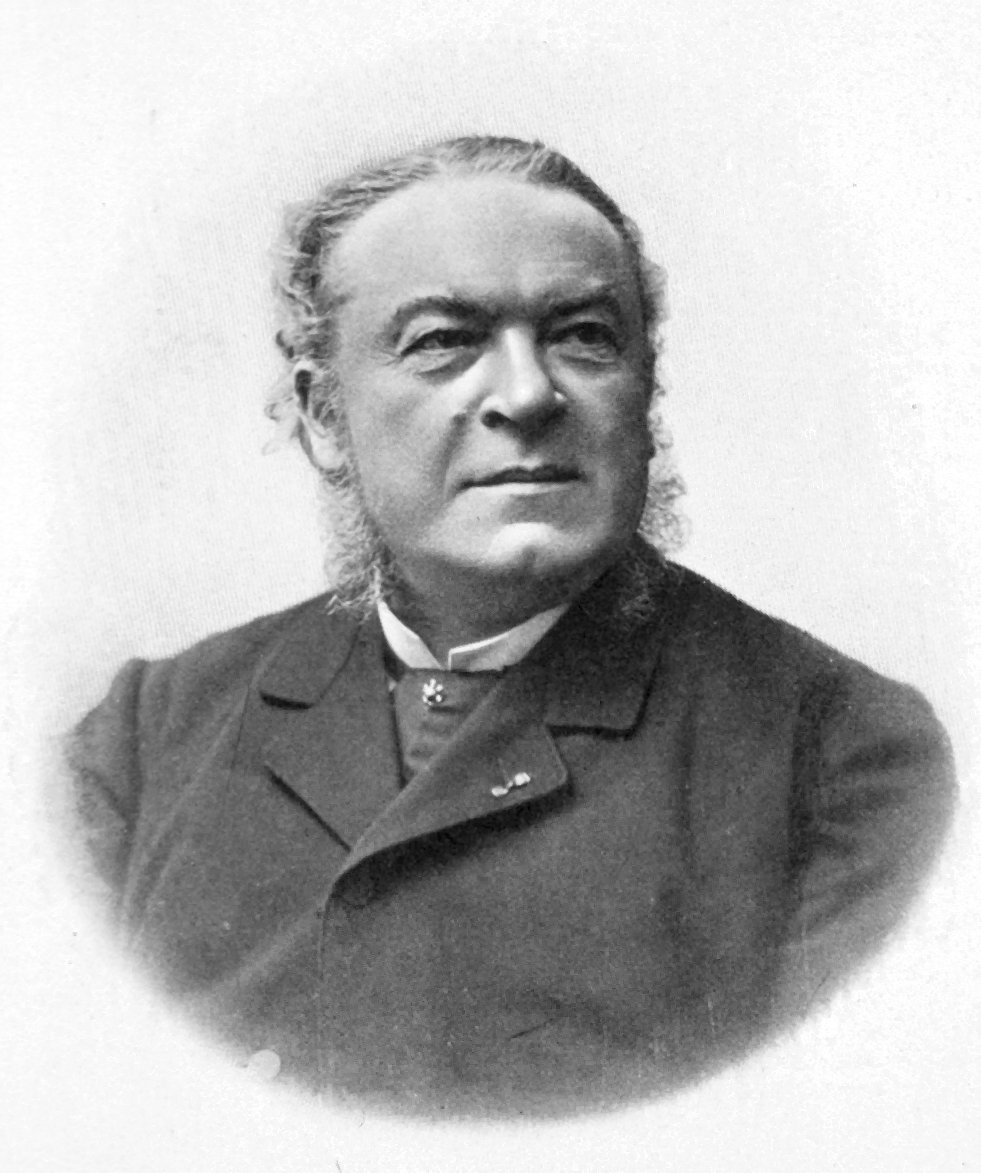
Paul Jules Tillaux

Paul Jules Tillaux (8 December 1834 – 20 October 1904) was a French physician who was a native of Aunay-sur-Odon, département Calvados.

Tillaux was a surgeon and professor of surgery in Paris, and in 1879 became a member of the Académie de Médecine. He was director of the Amphitheatre d'Anatomie des Hopitaux de Paris from 1868 to 1890.

In 1892, Tillaux was the first physician to describe an uncommon Salter Harris Type III fracture of the tibia. He performed experiments on cadavers and discovered that stress to the anterior inferior tibiofibular ligament could lead to this type of avulsion fracture. This fracture is unique because it occurs during a certain period of adolescence, when there is a differential rate of growth of the epiphysis. In honor of his discovery, a fracture of the anterolateral tibial epiphysis is now called a Tillaux fracture — often misdiagnosed as a simple sprain. A similar fracture to the posterolateral tibia was later identified by surgeon Henri Chaput, thus being referred to as a Tillaux-Chaput fracture.

== Additional eponyms ==
- "Tillaux' apparatus": A device used to reduce and maintain femoral diaphysis fractures in constant steady extension.
- "Tillaux' manoeuvre": Procedure for demonstrating the presence of a breast tumour adhering to the pectoralis major muscle.
- "Tillaux' sign": The presence of a resonant area between the pubic bone and a tumor is an indication of a mesenteric tumor.
- "Tillaux' spiral": An imaginary spiraling line connecting the insertions of the eye's recti muscles.

== Selected writings ==
- De l'urétrotomie (1863).
- Traité d'anatomie topographique avec applications à la chirurgie; 2 volumes 1875–77).
