= Maisonneuve fracture =

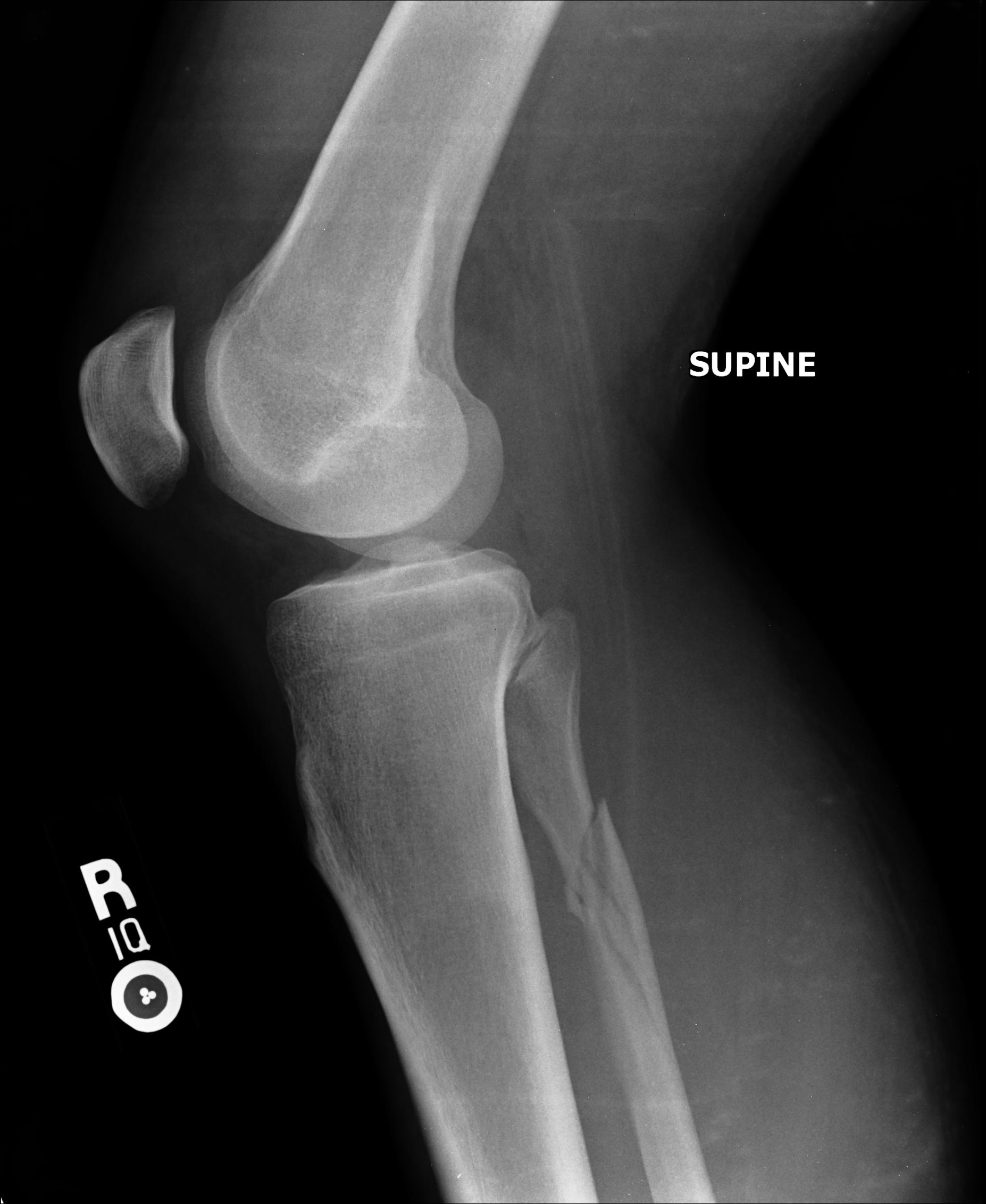
- Radiograph showing a Maisonneuve fracture of the proximal fibula
- Specialty: Orthopedics
- Symptoms: Swelling around medial and lateral sides of ankle joint, pain during external rotation of foot
- Complications: Osteoarthritis, peroneal nerve palsy
- Causes: Forceful, external rotation of the foot
- Risk factors: Sporting injuries, falls, motor vehicle accidents
- Diagnostic method: Physical examination, radiography, X-ray, CT, MRI, arthroscopy
- Differential diagnosis: Isolated tibiofibular syndesmosis injury, isolated fibula fracture
- Treatment: Orthopedic casting, ORIF, CRIF

The Maisonneuve fracture is a spiral fracture of the proximal third of the fibula associated with a tear of the distal tibiofibular syndesmosis and the interosseous membrane. There is an associated fracture of the medial malleolus or rupture of the deep deltoid ligament of the ankle. This type of injury can be difficult to detect.

The Maisonneuve fracture is typically a result of excessive, external rotative force being applied to the deltoid and syndesmotic ligaments. Due to this, the Maisonneuve fracture is described as a pronation-external rotation injury according to the Lauge-Hansen classification system. It is also classified as a Type C ankle fracture according to the Danis-Weber classification system.

The Maisonneuve fracture is similar to the Galeazzi fracture in the sense that there is an important ligamentous disruption in association with the fracture. The fracture is named after the surgeon Jules Germain François Maisonneuve.

== Cause ==
Forceful, external rotation of the ankle joint is the main cause of a Maisonneuve fracture. Engaging in high-intensity sports or falling over can increase the risk of tearing the deltoid ligament or cause an avulsion fracture of the medial malleolus from external rotation of the foot. In some cases, motor vehicle accidents can also result in a Maisonneuve fracture.

== Signs and symptoms ==
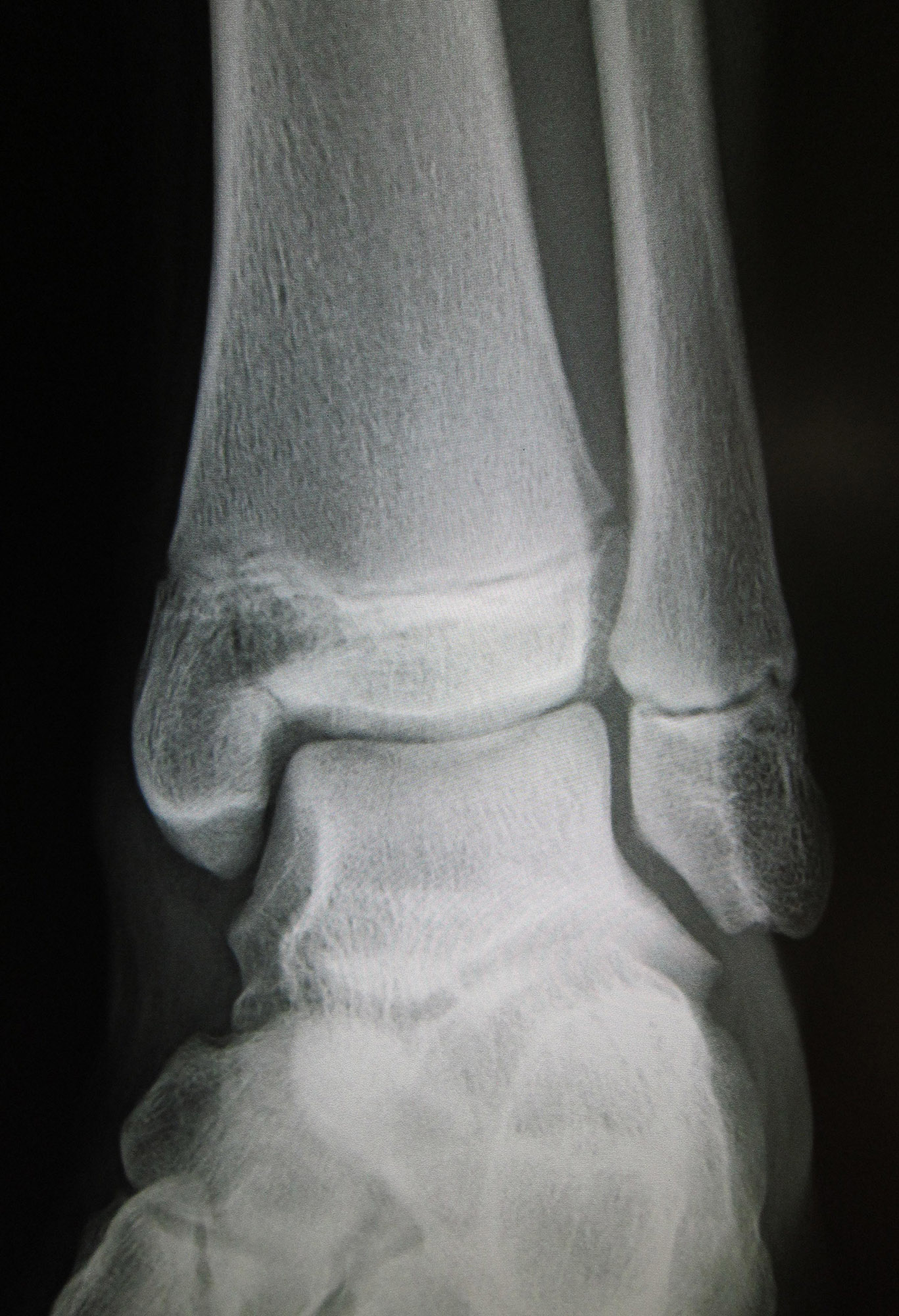
Fracture of the medial malleolus seen on X-ray scan (left ankle)

Common symptoms of a Maisonneuve fracture are pain, swelling, tenderness, and bruising around the ankle joint and inferior (or distal) tibiofibular joint. More specifically, as a pronation-external rotation injury, pain during external rotation of the ankle joint is expected. Additionally, there is a reduced range of motion of the foot and an inability to weight-bear due to ankle pain. Pain may also be felt around the medial and lateral aspects of the ankle, and more rarely around the superior (or proximal) tibiofibular joint. Damage to the deltoid ligament or interosseous membrane can cause haemorrhaging around the surrounding tissues, resulting in a localised oedema.

As the syndesmotic ligaments are responsible for stabilising the ankle mortise and tibiotalar joint, disruption to this syndesmosis can cause a reduction of the space between the distal tibia, fibula, and talus. A long-term effect of this is painful ankle osteoarthritis due to the direct contact between the tibia and talus.

If a Maisonneuve fracture is left untreated, instability of the tibiotalar joint and deltoid ligament can cause a valgus deformity of the ankle. This leaves the ankle joint in a state of chronic pronation, characterised by a protrusion of the medial malleolus into the subcutaneous tissue.

== Pathophysiology ==
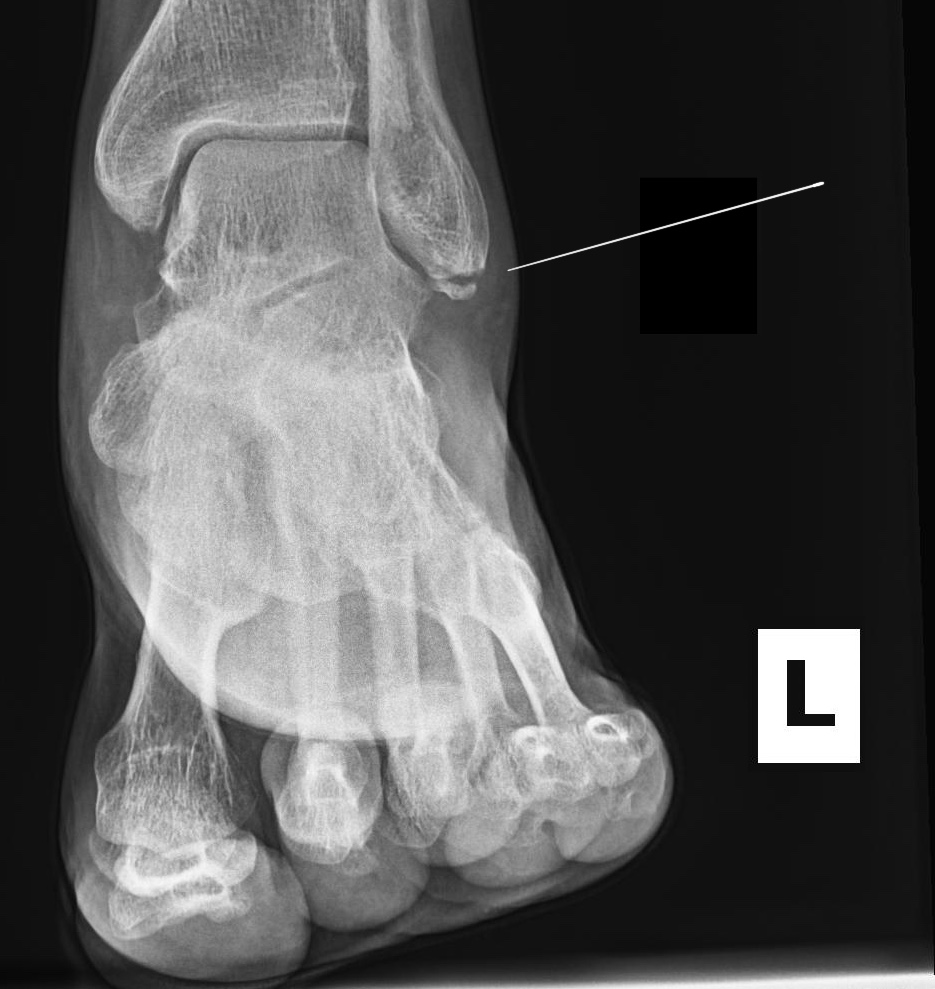
Fracture of the lateral malleolus seen on X-ray scan (left ankle)

The Maisonneuve fracture generally follows a specific pattern of injury. The following are described as subsequent events that result in a Maisonneuve fracture:

- Forceful, external rotation of the ankle joint results in the tearing of the deep deltoid ligament and/or an avulsion fracture of the medial malleolus.
- The ankle mortise is subjected to excessive torque, rupturing the syndesmotic ligaments and anteromedial ankle joint capsule.
- Rotative energy is transferred upwards along the interosseous membrane, damaging it in the process.
- The force results in a spiral, sometimes an oblique, fracture at the neck of the proximal fibula.

In cases where the anterior aspect of the tibiofibular syndesmosis can resist mechanical stress, only an oblique fracture of the lateral malleolus is produced. Diastasis of the lateral malleolus may also occur, in which it is posterolaterally displaced from the tibia.

Although most Maisonneuve cases report a pronation-external rotation mechanism of injury, clinical studies have recorded instances of supination-external rotation being the mechanism of injury. Slight or high degrees of plantarflexion prior to supination-external rotation of the foot have been identified in patients with proximal fibular fractures.

== Diagnosis ==
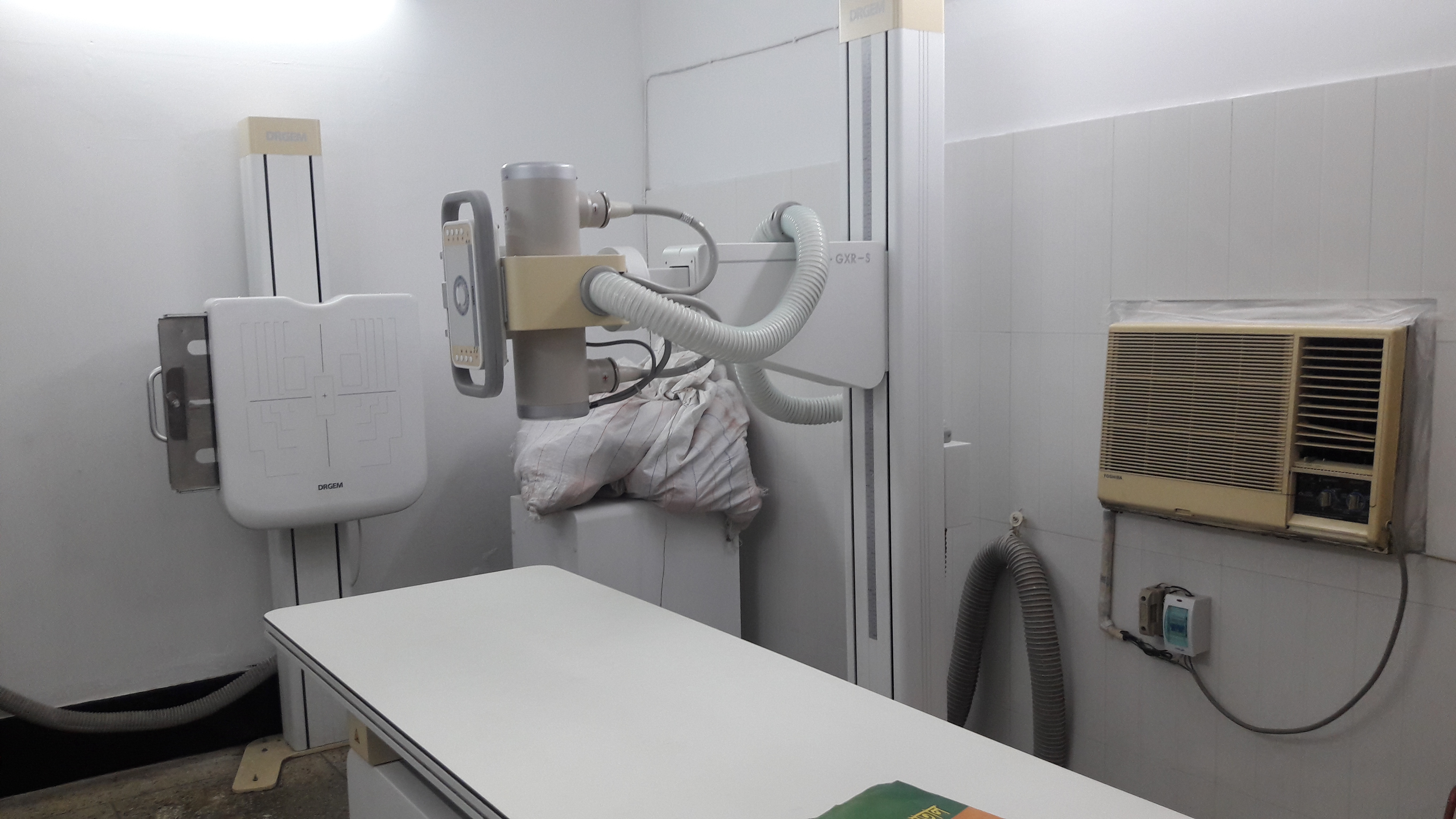
A digital radiography machine

Diagnosing a Maisonneuve fracture requires a combination of medical history, physical examination, and radiographic imaging. Patients generally do not report pain near the proximal fibula, so physical examination such as palpation along the fibula is effective for differentiating a Maisonneuve fracture from an isolated syndesmotic injury. Feeling pain near the proximal fibula during palpation is a positive indication of a Maisonneuve fracture. Ankle instability is often associated with a damaged proximal fibula in a Maisonneuve fracture, so patients are typically asked about the mechanism of injury. Mortise stability is examined to rule out the possibility of an isolated fibular fracture.

Ankle radiographs are used to detect widening of the tibiofibular syndesmosis or medial clear space. The medial clear space is the area between the talus of the ankle and the medial malleolus. Damage to the deltoid ligament and syndesmotic ligaments result in mortise instability, causing the talus to laterally shift and widen the medial clear space. A clinical study, conducted in 2006 and published in the Journal of Bone and Joint Surgery, found that the medial clear space size of a normal ankle and an injured ankle measured at 4 millimetres and 5.4 millimetres in length respectively. To confirm diagnosis, full-leg radiographs are used to inspect for fractures of the proximal fibula and widening of the interosseous clear space (or tibiofibular clear space). The interosseous clear space is the area between the medial side of the fibula and lateral side of the tibia. A peer-reviewed study, published in Injury in 2004, found that an interosseous clear space greater than 10 millimetres indicates diastasis of the syndesmotic ligaments.

If necessary, computed tomography (CT) or magnetic resonance imaging (MRI) may also be used to clarify diagnosis. MRI scans can check for interosseous membrane or tibial tubercle damage if high instability of the ankle is diagnosed. Arthroscopy may be used to diagnose a syndesmotic lesion but is often not recommended due to operative difficulty. Stress radiographs of the ankle are used to assess the integrity of the deltoid ligament and tibiofibular syndesmosis. The size of the medial clear space can also be measured using stress radiography.

=== Classification ===
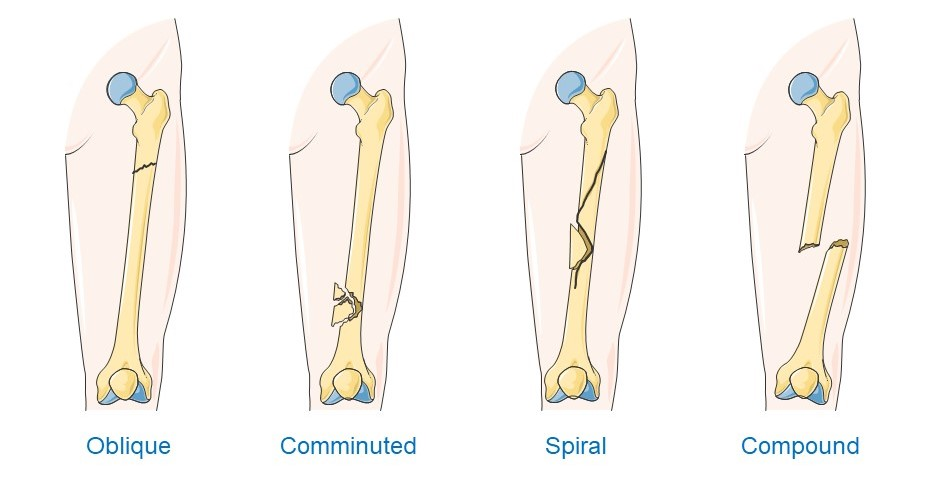
Types of bone fractures

A Maisonneuve fracture may be a simple fracture or comminuted fracture:

- A simple fracture, in the case of a Maisonneuve fracture, only refers to the fibula being broken in one place without any damage being done to the surrounding tissues.
- A comminuted fracture is when the bone is broken in more than two places.

X-ray, CT, or MRI scans can be used to diagnose the extent of the Maisonneuve fracture's damage and determine whether it is a simple or comminution fracture. During diagnosis, a supination-external rotation pattern of injury may also be concluded if there is an isolated fracture of the posterior tubercle of the tibia.

== Treatment ==
- Reduce the proximal fibula and medial malleolus to achieve stabilisation
- Repair the distal tibiofibular syndesmosis and deltoid ligament
- Restore ankle mortise stability

Treatment can be achieved by either non-operative (or conservative) or operative means. The main operative treatments for a Maisonneuve fracture are open-reduction surgery and closed-reduction surgery, both of which usually preceding internal fixation of the injury. These procedures are known as Open Reduction Internal Fixation (ORIF) and Closed Reduction Internal Fixation (CRIF).

=== Internal fixators ===
Syndesmotic screws are the main, internal fixators used in surgeries for a Maisonneuve fracture. Two main types of syndesmotic screws are used: trans-syndesmotic screws (positioned at the level of the syndesmosis) and supra-syndesmotic screws (positioned above the syndesmosis).

Based on several clinical results, syndesmotic screws are recommended to be fixed at least 1 centimetre proximal to the tibiofibular syndesmosis or 4 to 6 centimetres proximal to the tibiotalar joint line. Cadaveric analyses, from a comparative study published in Foot & Ankle International in 1997, suggest that screw fixation at 2 centimetres proximal to the tibiotalar joint line is also adequate. Biodegradable implants such as bioabsorbable screws, which do not require postoperative removal, may be used as an alternative to metallic hardware. However, biodegradable implants still limit rotation of the ankle and dorsiflexion of the foot.

=== Non-operative treatment ===
In cases where only the posterior ligaments of the tibiofibular syndesmosis are partially damaged, non-operative treatment such as long-leg casting for at least 6 weeks is recommended. Immobilisation techniques such as casting are often paired with non-weight bearing precautions. Gradually, physiotherapy rehabilitation programs allow patients to weight-bear after at least 8 weeks of postoperative casting. Orthopaedic surgeons also administer these non-operative treatments for cases where the medial malleolus remains intact.

=== Operative treatment ===
==== Open Reduction Internal Fixation (ORIF) ====
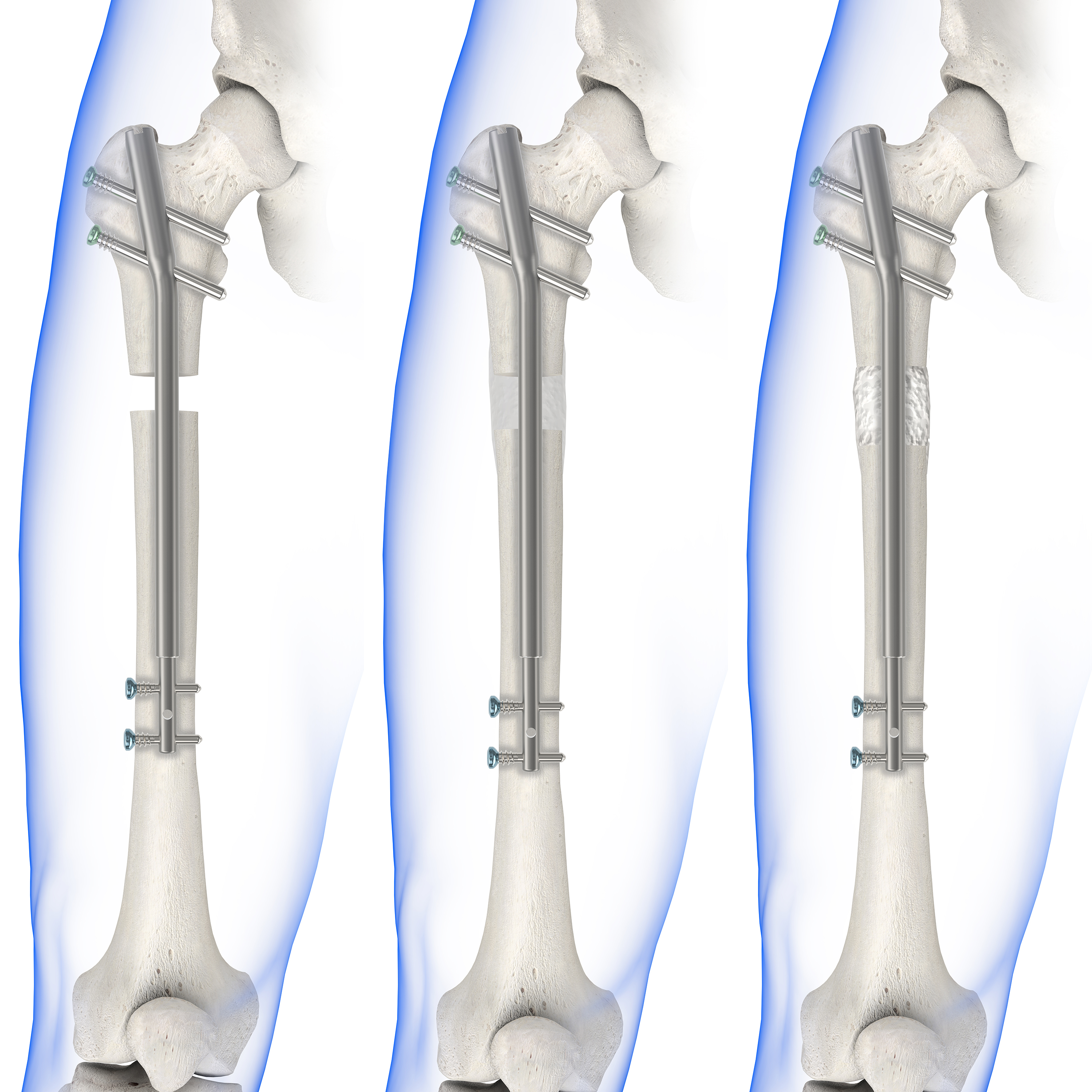
Distraction osteogenesis

Open-reduction surgery is typically not performed at the level of the proximal fibula, as dissection near the proximal end may risk severing the common peroneal nerve. Instead, reducing the proximal fibula at the level of the distal tibiofibular syndesmosis is recommended. A hook test is performed, using a curved hook, to assess the stability of the fibula. If instability is detected, further distraction of the fibula can be done to repair the full bone. The fibula can then be guided into the fibular notch located on the tibia, effectively restoring its length. Internal rotation of the foot may then be used to correct anatomical alignment.

Following open-reduction, internal fixation is usually performed to stabilise the ankle mortise. To account for the distal fibula being slightly posterior to the distal tibia, drill holes are angled at 30° from the anteromedial aspect of the tibia to the posterolateral aspect of the fibula. Trans-syndesmotic screws can be inserted in this way to ensure tibia fixation. Additional supra-syndesmotic screws may be temporarily inserted, for approximately 3 to 6 months, if instability is still present after fibular reduction. To reduce the fibula and restore the ankle mortise to its proper anatomical configuration, partial dorsiflexion of the foot is maintained prior to intraoperative screw fixation. This is because, in a neutral or maximally dorsiflexed position of the foot, the trochlear surface of the talus may reduce maximal postoperative dorsiflexion due to rigidity after screw fixation.

Assessing the severity of syndesmotic lesions can be performed with fluoroscopic screening. Guidance under fluoroscopy can also assist with syndesmotic screw fixation. Restoration of the anteromedial joint capsule of the ankle can be achieved with suturing techniques.

==== Closed Reduction Internal Fixation (CRIF) ====
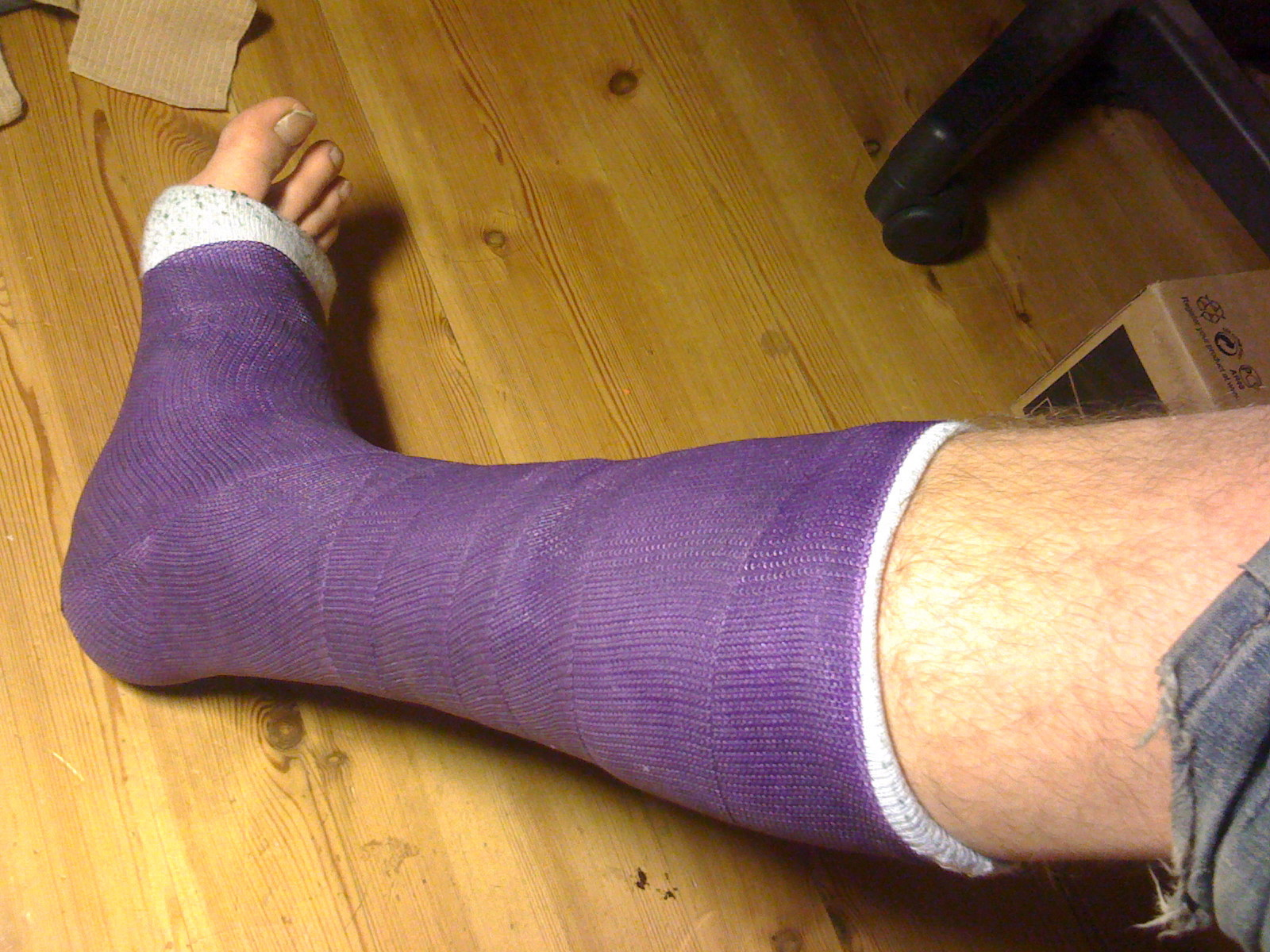
Short-leg cast

Closed-reduction surgery requires no dissection or incisions being made into the leg to operate. It is most commonly applied in cases where the Maisonneuve fracture has only extensively damaged the anterior portion of the syndesmotic ligaments. That is, the posterior hinge of the ankle is still stable, and the foot can be internally rotated using traction to restore fibular bone length. Long-leg casting or short-leg casting is applied postoperatively to maintain this alignment.

It is generally recommended that medial malleolar fractures do not require surgical intervention if closed reduction is sufficient for the restoration of bone length. Otherwise, large medial malleolar fractures can be fixed using trans-syndesmotic screws, figure-of-8 wires, or Kirschner wires. For smaller medial malleolar fractures, repair with a wire-tension band is sufficient.

=== Complications ===
Delaying diagnosis and treatment can result in intraoperative complications. In one case of a clinical study, conducted in 2000 and published in Orthopedics, the insertion of a super-syndesmotic screw caused the lateral malleolus to be further shifted laterally; subsequent removal of the screw was necessary.

Complications that may postoperatively occur include:

- the development of osteoarthritis around the ankle joint.
- the development of peroneal nerve palsy following damage to the common peroneal nerve.
- extra-osseous ("outside of the bone") calcification of vessels or tissues surrounding the tibiofibular joint.

==== Surgical hardware complications ====
Incorrectly positioned screws can potentially make contact with articular surfaces, which can cause calcification around the affected area. Screw breakage can also cause pain in these areas.

Postoperative hardware removal can cause problems such as infection, joint rigidity, or diastasis if fixation was not sufficiently long enough. In areas where residual stiffness has persisted, patients may report feeling pain or a mild aching sensation. Generally, it is recommended that hardware removal should be done anywhere from 6 weeks to 12 weeks after internal fixation to allow the tibiofibular syndesmosis to properly heal. Syndesmotic screws should be removed prior to rehabilitative training; bearing weight without prior hardware removal may result in ankle stiffness due to reduced dorsiflexion of the foot and potential screw breakage.

=== Postoperative follow-ups ===
Postoperative follow-ups are done to ensure that treatment has produced satisfactory results, such as checking if malreduction of any of the associated structures in a Maisonneuve fracture has occurred. Follow-ups may be performed from 6 months to 2 years after the surgery and are applicable for both non-operative and operative treatments.

== Epidemiology ==
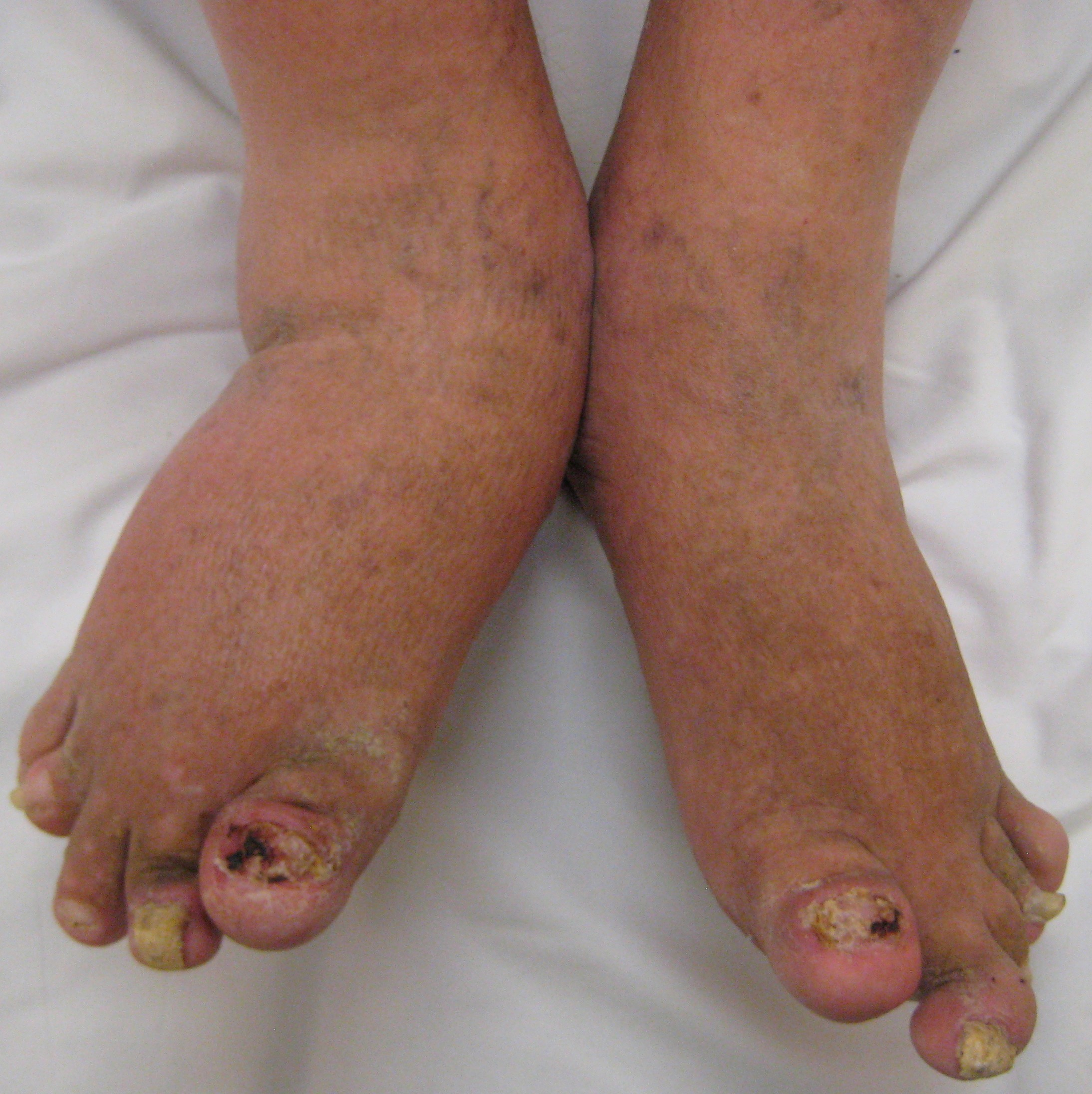
Psoriatic arthritis affecting the foot

Exact incidence rates are unknown, but it is believed that the Maisonneuve fracture accounts for 5% of all ankle injuries treated in surgery. The Maisonneuve fracture has been reported in patients as young as 17–19 years old, and up to 42–70 years old. The injury is mostly seen in male patients. A clinical article on studies conducted between 2014 and 2019, published in Orthopaedic Surgery in 2020, reported that 78% of admitted patients with a Maisonneuve fracture were male.

Sporting injuries are the most common risk factor of causing a Maisonneuve fracture. Sport-related injuries were associated with 50% of all Maisonneuve fracture cases examined in one clinical study. Comorbidity of the Maisonneuve fracture and other health conditions, such as hypertension, obesity, and psoriatic arthritis, have been identified in patient medical histories.
