= Herscovici classification =

Method to classify an ankle fracture

The Herscovici classification is a system of categorizing medial malleolus fractures of the distal tibia based on level.

== Classification ==
Type	Description
A	Avulsion fracture of the anterior colliculus involving the superficial deltoid ligament
B	Intermediate fracture
C	Fracture at the level of the plafond (Lauge-Hansen external rotation-abduction type)
D	Plafond fracture (Lauge-Hansen supination-adduction type)

== See also ==
- Ankle fracture
- Pilon fracture
- Danis–Weber classification
- Lauge-Hansen classification
