= Ankle fracture =

- Other names: Broken ankle
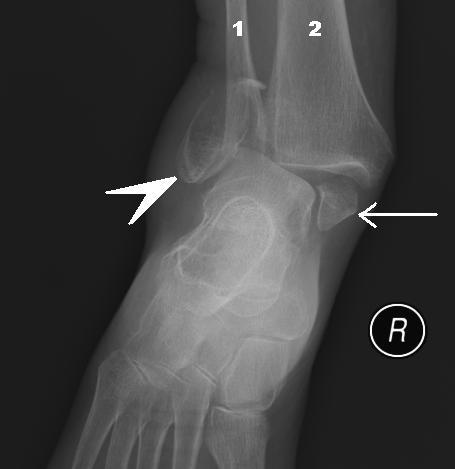
- Fracture of both sides of the ankle with dislocation as seen on anteroposterior X-ray. (1) fibula, (2) tibia, (arrow) medial malleolus, (arrowhead) lateral malleolus
- Specialty: Orthopedics, emergency medicine
- Symptoms: Pain, swelling, bruising, inability to walk
- Complications: High ankle sprain, compartment syndrome, decreased range of motion, malunion
- Usual onset: Young males, older females
- Types: Lateral malleolus, medial malleolus, posterior malleolus, bimalleolar, trimalleolar
- Causes: Rolling the ankle, blunt trauma
- Diagnostic method: X-rays based on the Ottawa ankle rule
- Differential diagnosis: Rheumatoid arthritis, gout, septic arthritis, Achilles tendon rupture
- Treatment: Splinting, casting, surgery
- Frequency: ~1 per 1000/year

An ankle fracture is a break of one or more of the bones that make up the ankle joint. Symptoms may include pain, swelling, bruising, and an inability to walk on the injured leg. Complications may include an associated high ankle sprain, compartment syndrome, stiffness, malunion, and post-traumatic arthritis.

Ankle fractures may result from excessive stress on the joint such as from rolling an ankle or from blunt trauma. Types of ankle fractures include lateral malleolus, medial malleolus, posterior malleolus, bimalleolar, and trimalleolar fractures. The Ottawa ankle rule can help determine the need for X-rays. Special X-ray views called stress views help determine whether an ankle fracture is unstable.

Treatment depends on the fracture type. Ankle stability largely dictates non-operative vs. operative treatment. Non-operative treatment includes splinting or casting while operative treatment includes fixing the fracture with metal implants through an open reduction internal fixation (ORIF). Significant recovery generally occurs within four months while complete recovery usually takes up to one year.

Ankle fractures are common, occurring in over 1.8 per 1000 adults and 1 per 1000 children per year. In North America this figure increases to more than 14 in ever 10,000 patients admitted to the Emergency Room. They occur most commonly in young males and older females.

== Functional anatomy ==
The ankle region refers to where the leg meets the foot (talocrural region). The ankle joint is a highly constrained, complex hinge joint composed of three bones: the tibia, the fibula, and the talus. The weight-bearing aspect of the tibia closest to the foot (known as the plafond) connects with the talus. This articulation (where two bones meet) is primarily responsible for plantarflexion (moving your foot down) and dorsiflexion (moving your foot up). Together the tibia and fibula form a bracket-shaped socket known as the mortise, into which the dome-shaped talus fits. The talus and the fibula are connected by a strong group of ligaments, which provide support for the lateral aspect of the ankle. These ligaments include the anterior talofibular ligament (ATFL) and the posterior talofibular ligament (PTFL). The calcaneofibular ligament (CFL), which connects the fibula to the calcaneus, or heel bone, also provides lateral support. The deltoid ligament provides support to the medial part of the ankle (closest to the midline). It prevents the foot from excessively everting, or turning outwards while also preventing the talus from externally rotating. The distal parts of the tibia and fibula are connected by a connective tissue network referred to as the syndesmosis, which consists of four ligaments and the interosseous membrane.

== Signs and symptoms ==
Symptoms of an ankle fracture can be similar to those of ankle sprains (pain, swelling, limited range of motion), though typically they are often more severe by comparison. It is exceedingly rare for the ankle joint to dislocate in the presence of ligamentous injury alone. However, in the setting of an ankle fracture, the talus can become unstable and subluxate or dislocate. Patients may notice ecchymosis ("black and blue" coloration from bleeding under the skin), or there may be an abnormal position, alignment, gross instability, or lack of normal motion secondary to pain. In a displaced fracture the skin is sometimes tented over a sharp edge of broken bone. The sharp fragments of broken bone sometimes tear the skin and form a laceration that communicates with the broken bone or joint space. This is known as an open fracture and has a high incidence of infection if not promptly treated.

Ankle anatomy

== Diagnosis ==
=== Physical Examination ===
Patients with ankle fractures may have variable findings on physical examination. Generally, the injured side should be compared to the non-injured side. The skin should be carefully examined, paying particular attention to any openings or breaks in the skin that could be due to an open fracture. It is important to evaluate the exact location of the pain, the range of motion of the ankle, and the condition of the nerves and blood vessels. It is also important to palpate the calf proximally (near the knee) because there may be an associated high fibula fracture (Maisonneuve fracture).

=== Imaging ===
Imaging for evaluation of ankle fractures can include x-rays, CT scans, and MRIs. Typically evaluation begins with x-rays, which can provide information about the mechanism of injury, severity of injury, and stability of fracture. The Ottawa ankle rules determine the necessity of obtaining x-rays in patients with acute ankle injuries. These guidelines were created to minimize the expense of unnecessary x-rays.

==== X-ray ====
Views

There are three x-ray views in a complete ankle series: anteroposterior (AP), lateral, and oblique (or "mortise view"). The mortise view is an AP x-ray taken with the ankle internally rotated 15-20 degrees since the foot is naturally externally rotated relative to the ankle. In addition to these views, a full-length view of the tibia and fibula may be necessary to evaluate for injuries to the proximal fibula associated with Maisonneuve fractures.

A specialized AP stress view of the ankle is performed when there is concern for an unstable ankle injury. There are two types of stress views: gravity and mechanical. In the gravity stress view, the patient lies in the lateral decubitus position with the ankle dangling over the edge of the table to mimic the mechanical stress view.

Findings

On X-rays, there can be a fracture of the medial malleolus, the lateral malleolus, and/or of the anterior/posterior margin of the distal tibia. The posterior margin (known as the posterior malleolus) is much more frequently injured than the anterior aspect of the distal tibia. If both the lateral and medial malleoli are broken, this is called a bimalleolar fracture (some of them are called Pott's fractures). If the posterior malleolus is also fractured, this is called a trimalleolar fracture.

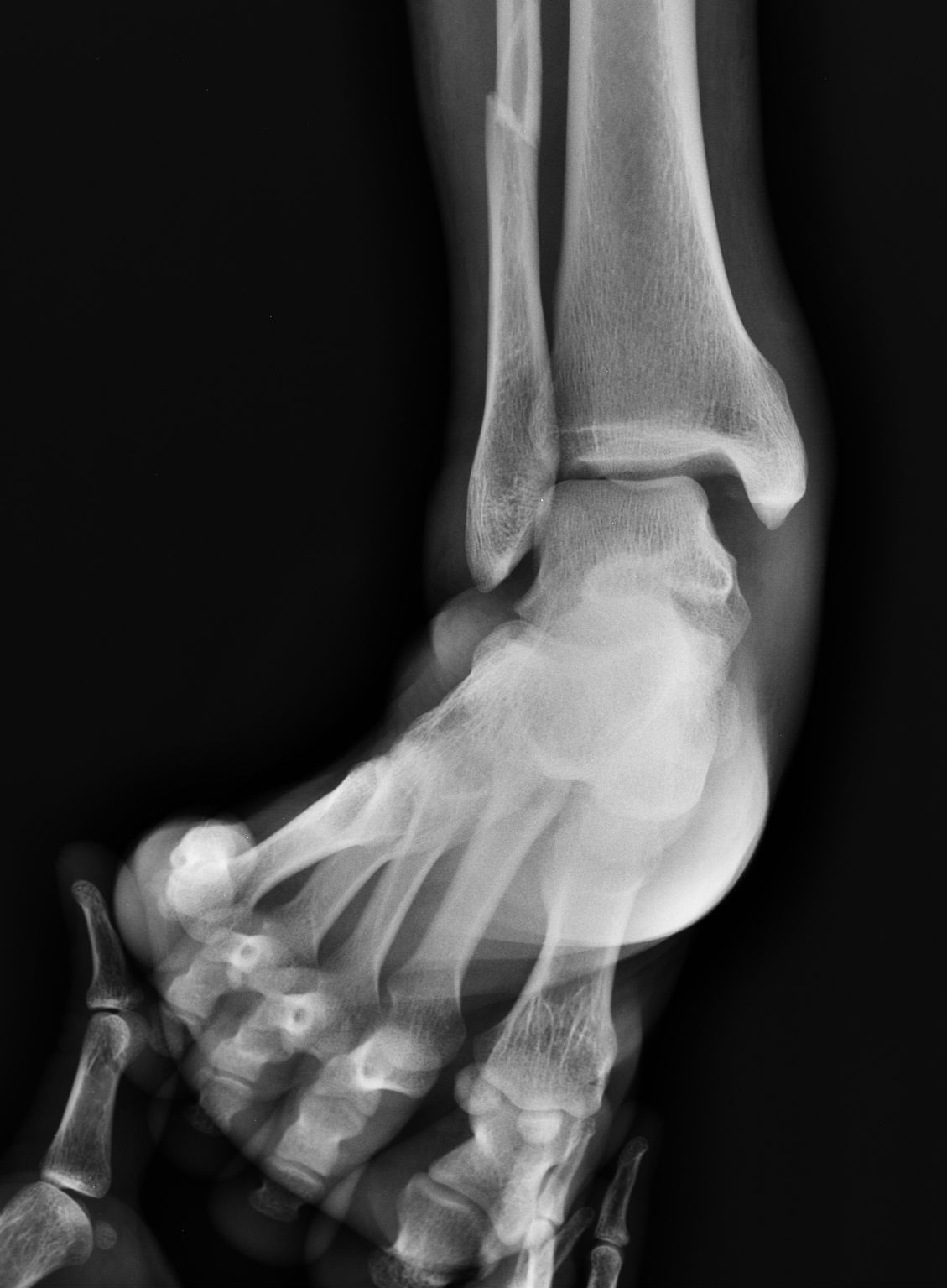
AP manual stress view showing a deltoid ligament tear

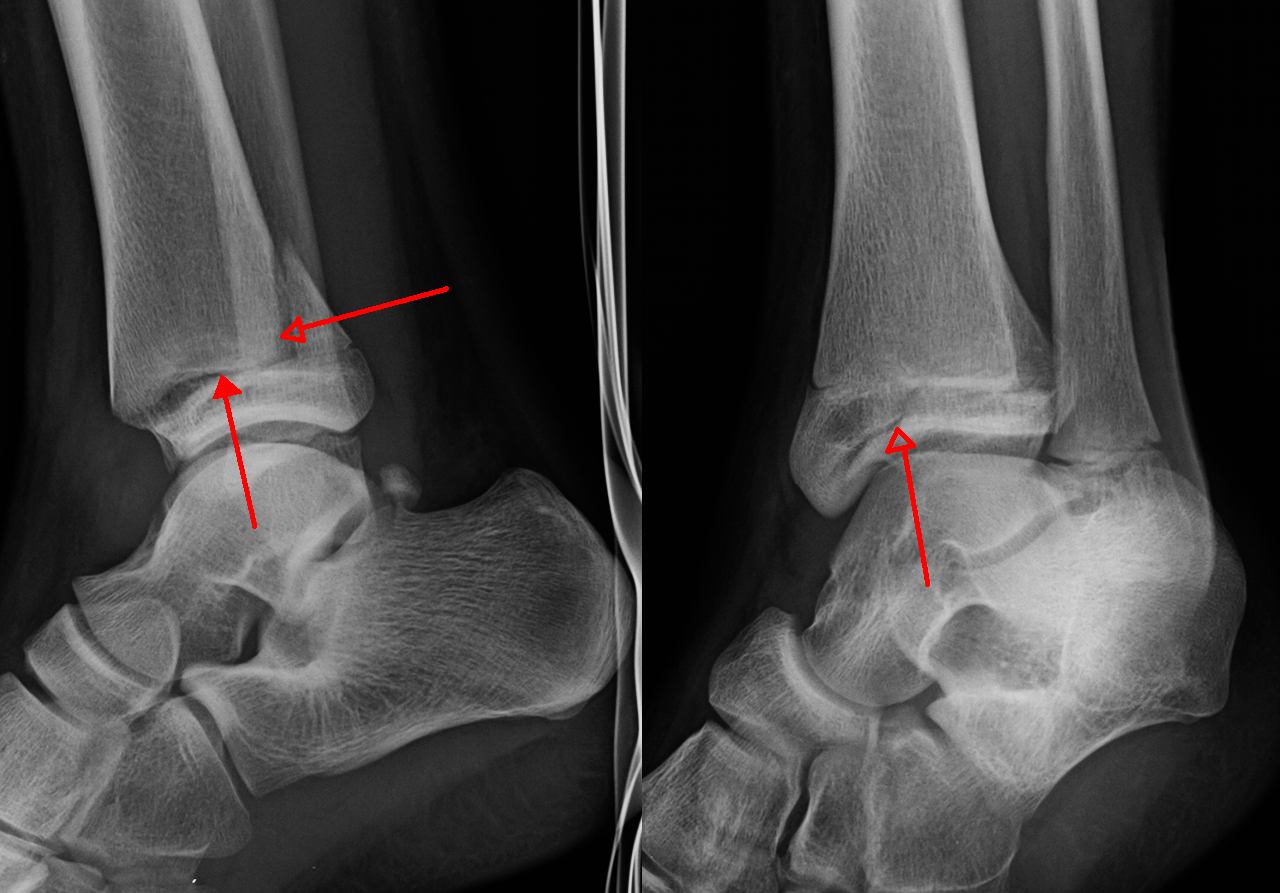
A triplane fracture of the ankle as seen on plain X-ray

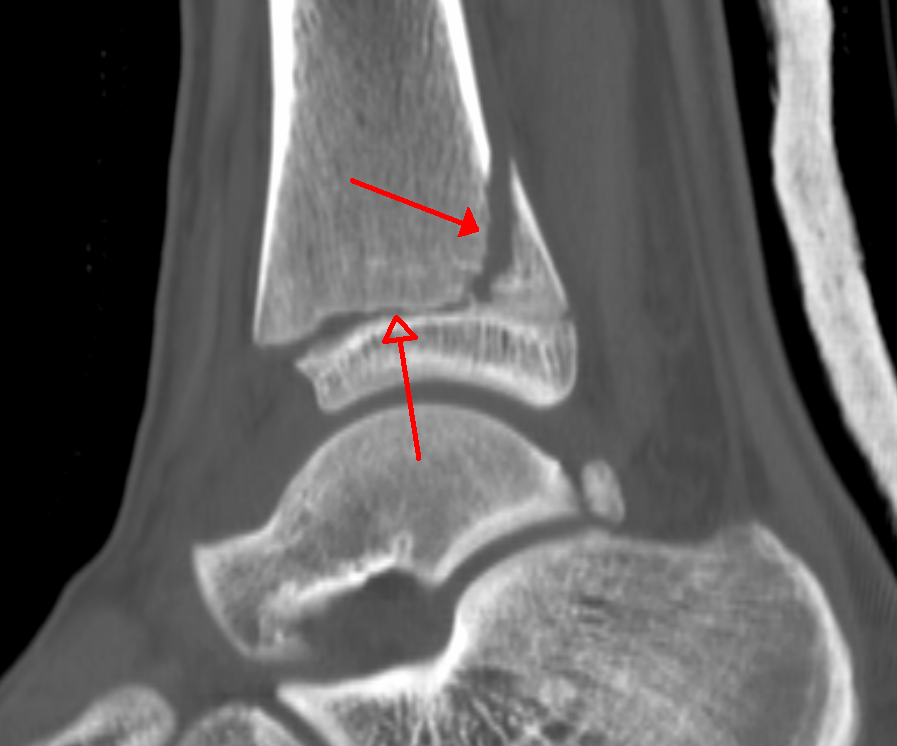
A triplane fracture of the ankle as seen on CT

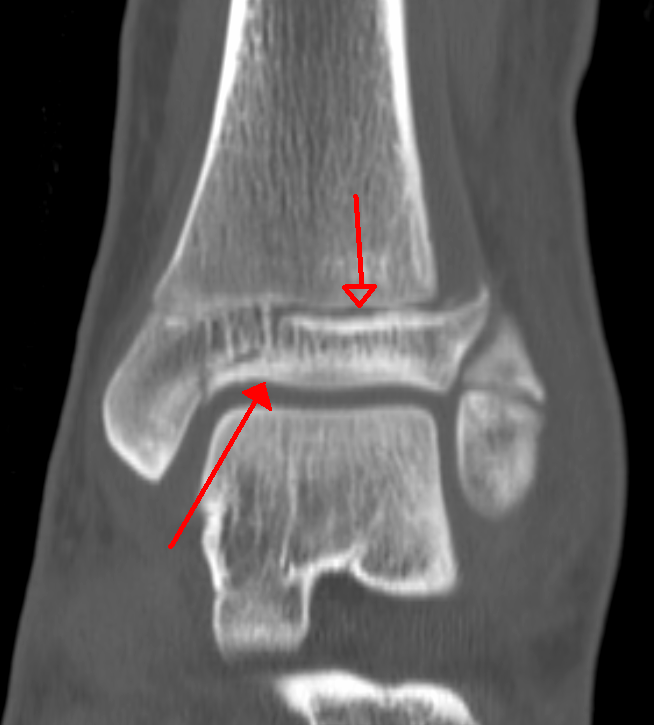
A triplane fracture of the ankle as seen on CT

==== CT ====
CT scans may be indicated when there is concern for a highly comminuted fracture or a fracture involving the joint surface. This imaging may be used for surgical planning.

==== MRI ====
MRI is less commonly used to diagnose ankle fractures but may be used to show problems involving the soft tissues (ligaments and tendons) and articular cartilage.

=== Classification ===
Danis-Weber classification (type A, B and C)

There are several classification schemes for ankle fractures. Out of the following, the Lauge-Hansen and Danis-Weber classification systems are most commonly used.

- The Lauge-Hansen classification categorizes fractures based on the mechanism of the injury as it relates to the position of the foot and the deforming force (the most common type is supination-external rotation)
- The Danis-Weber classification categorizes ankle fractures by the level of the fracture of the distal fibula (type A = below the syndesmotic ligament, type B = at its level, type C = above the ligament), with use in assessing injury to the syndesmosis and the interosseous membrane

Other classification schemes:

- The Herscovici classification categorizes medial malleolus fractures of the distal tibia based on level.
- The Ruedi-Allgower classification categorizes pilon fractures of the distal tibia.

=== Pediatric fracture types ===
- Wagstaffe-Le Fort avulsion fracture¨, a vertical fracture of the antero-medial part of the distal fibula with avulsion of the anterior tibiofibular ligament.
- Tillaux fracture, a Salter–Harris type III fracture through the anterolateral aspect of the distal tibial epiphysis.
- Triplane fractures are a special type of fracture that involves the immature skeleton. It has a coronal plane in the metaphysis, an axial plane in the physis, and a sagittal plane in the epiphysis.
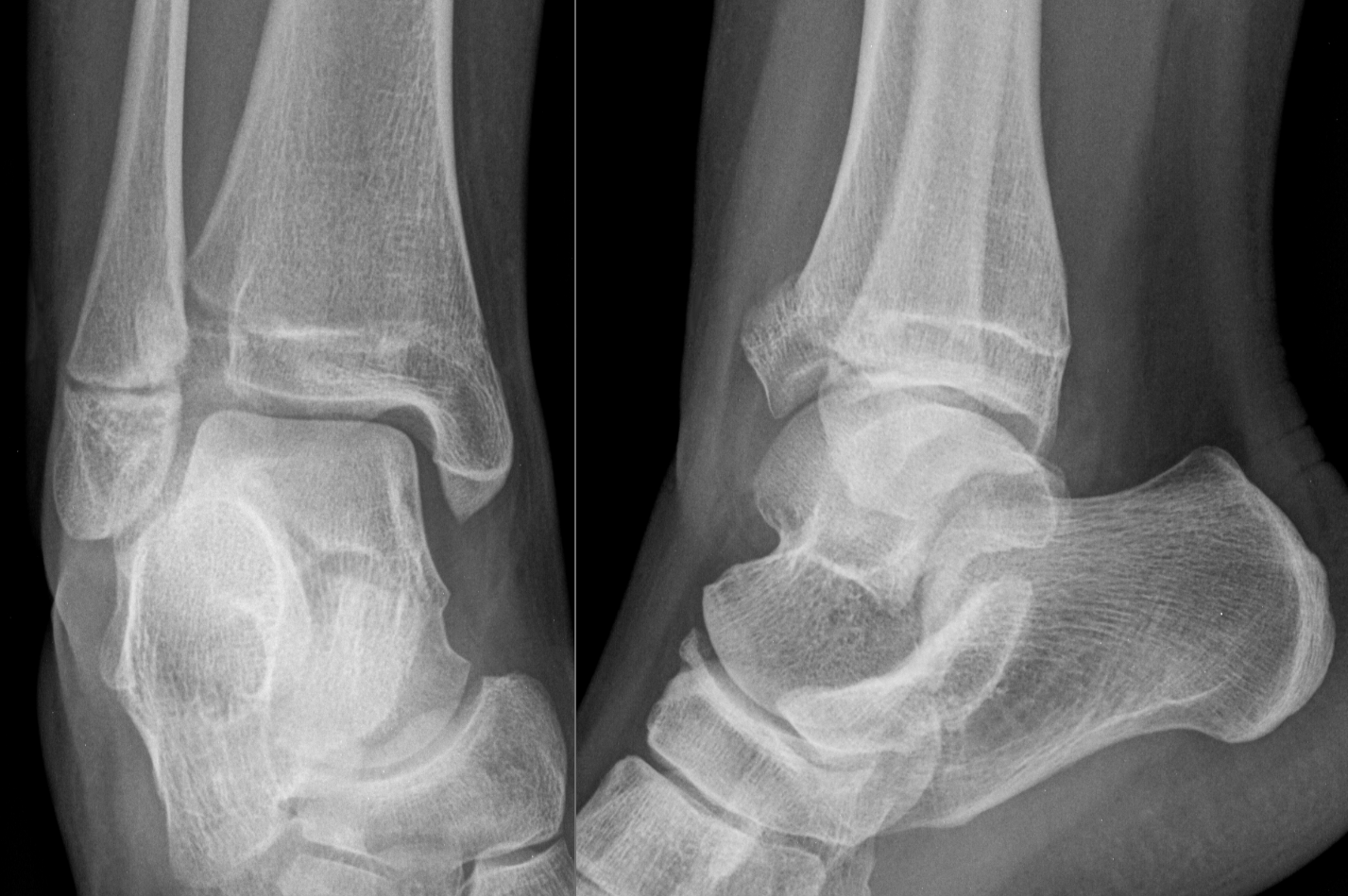
Tillaux fracture

== Treatment ==
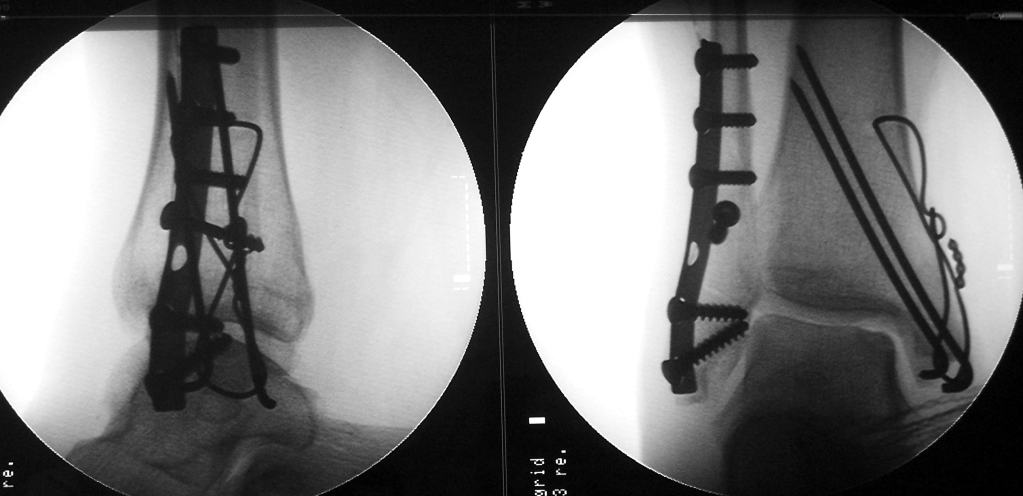
Surgically fixated bimalleolar ankle fracture

The broad goals of treating ankle fractures are restoring the ankle joint to normal alignment, healing the fracture, and preventing arthritis. The stability of the ankle joint often dictates treatment. Certain fracture patterns are stable and are thus treated without surgery similarly to ankle sprains. Unstable fractures require surgery, most often an open reduction and internal fixation (ORIF), which is usually performed with permanently implanted metal hardware that holds the bones in place while the natural healing process occurs. A cast or splint will be required to immobilize the ankle following surgery. Stable ankle fractures with preserved joint alignment may be treated with non-operative measures (splinting, casting, and/or walking boot).

After surgery for a broken ankle, it is common practice for people to be told to keep weight off their ankle for 6 weeks (delayed weight bearing). However, some surgeons encourage people to walk again after 2 weeks (early weight bearing). A randomised trial compared the safety of walking after 2 weeks with waiting 6 weeks. Researchers found that 4 months after surgery, people in both groups had similar ankle function (including pain, stiffness, and walking ability) and a similar number of complications. Costs to the NHS were lower for early weight bearing.

== Complications ==
General complications associated with surgical treatment include infection, bleeding, blood clots, wound healing problems, and damage to surrounding nerves and blood vessels. Specific complications associated with surgical treatment of ankle fractures include fracture healing in an abnormal position (malunion), post-traumatic arthritis, failed fracture healing after a prolonged period of time (nonunion), and decreased range of motion (post-operative stiffness). If post-operative x-rays are concerning for malunion, then patients may need an additional procedure to restore proper ankle anatomy. The ultimate goal is to prevent or delay the development of post-traumatic arthritis. Post-traumatic arthritis can initially be managed with conservative options like activity modification, non-steroidal anti-inflammatory medication (NSAIDs), specialized footwear, and cortisone injections. If patients still have pain and impaired ankle function after these measures, then other procedures such as ankle arthrodesis and ankle arthroplasty can be considered. Nonunion is rare following surgical fixation of ankle fractures but can be managed with bone grafts and stable internal fixation. Patients can also experience pain or discomfort from the metal hardware used to fix the fracture. As a result, some patients decide to have the hardware removed after the fracture has healed through an additional procedure.

== Epidemiology ==
Several large studies have suggested that the incidence of ankle fractures has increased since the 1960s. The incidence is highest in elderly women over the age of 65, but importantly ankle fractures are not considered as fragility fractures. In terms of fracture type, isolated malleolar fractures are most common (two-thirds of fractures); bimalleolar fractures occur in roughly 25% of patients while trimalleolar fractures occur in 5-10%. Open fractures are rare, compromising 2% of all ankle fractures. In children, ankle fractures occur in about 1 per 1000 per year.

== See also ==
- Maisonneuve fracture
- Pilon fracture
