= Ruedi–Allgower classification =

Method to classify an ankle fracture

The Ruedi–Allgower classification is a system of categorizing pilon fractures of the distal tibia.

== Classification ==
Type	Description
I	Non-displaced
II	Displaced but not comminuted
III	Comminuted articular surface

== See also ==
- Ankle fracture
- Herscovici classification
- Danis–Weber classification
- Lauge-Hansen classification
