= Tibiofibular ligament =

Tibiofibular ligament may refer to:

- Anterior tibiofibular ligament
- Interosseous membrane of leg, also known as middle tibiofibular ligament
- Posterior tibiofibular ligament
