= Colliculus =

Colliculus (Latin for "mound") can refer to:

== Anatomy ==
=== Midbrain ===
- Inferior colliculus, the principal midbrain nucleus of the auditory pathway
- Superior colliculus, a paired structure that forms a major component of the vertebrate midbrain
- Collicular arteries, which supply portions of the midbrain

=== Ankle ===
- Anterior colliculus, of the medial malleolus
- Posterior colliculus, of the medial malleolus

=== Other locations ===
- Seminal colliculus, a landmark near the entrance of the seminal vesicles
- Facial colliculus, an elevated area located on the dorsal pons
