= Bellevue/NYU Program for Survivors of Torture =

Bellevue Program for Survivors of Torture
- Abbreviation: PSOT
- Founded: 1995; 31 years ago
- Founder: Allen S. Keller, M.D.
- Type: Nonprofit organization
- Purpose: Torture, human rights, healthcare, research, education, advocacy
- Headquarters: Bellevue Hospital Center; New York City, New York, U.S.
- Region served: New York
- Key people: Allen S. Keller, M.D. (Founder); Hawthorne E. Smith, Ph.D. (Program Director)
- Website: www.survivorsoftorture.org
- Formerly called: Bellevue/NYU Program for Survivors of Torture

The Bellevue Program for Survivors of Torture (PSOT) was established in 1995 as joint project of Bellevue Hospital Center and the New York University School of Medicine to address the complex needs of torture survivors residing in the New York Metropolitan area. Since its founding, the Program continues to operate from Bellevue Hospital Center, located at 462 First Avenue CD723, New York City, NY 10016. The Program is the first and largest torture treatment center in the New York City area, providing multidisciplinary and comprehensive medical, mental health, legal, and social services to victims of torture and their families. PSOT's mission is to assist individuals subjected to torture and other human rights abuses to rebuild healthy, self-sufficient lives, and contribute to global efforts to end torture. Since its inception in 1995, PSOT has provided care to help rebuild the lives of more than 5,000 men, women, and children from over 100 countries.

In addition to providing direct clinical services, PSOT serves as a training and resource center for organizations in the United States and around the world assisting refugee and immigrant populations. The Program is internationally recognized for excellence in patient care, clinician training and other educational programs, research, and advocacy. PSOT and its staff have received numerous awards including the Jim Wright Vulnerable Populations Award from the National Association of Public Hospitals, the Roger E. Joseph Prize from Hebrew Union College, the Barbra Chester Award from the Hopi Foundation, and the prestigious 2006 Heroes Award from the Robin Hood Foundation.

The Bellevue Program for Survivors of Torture is a member of the National Consortium of Torture Treatment Programs (NCTTP) and the International Rehabilitation Council for Torture Victims (IRCT).

== Background and History ==
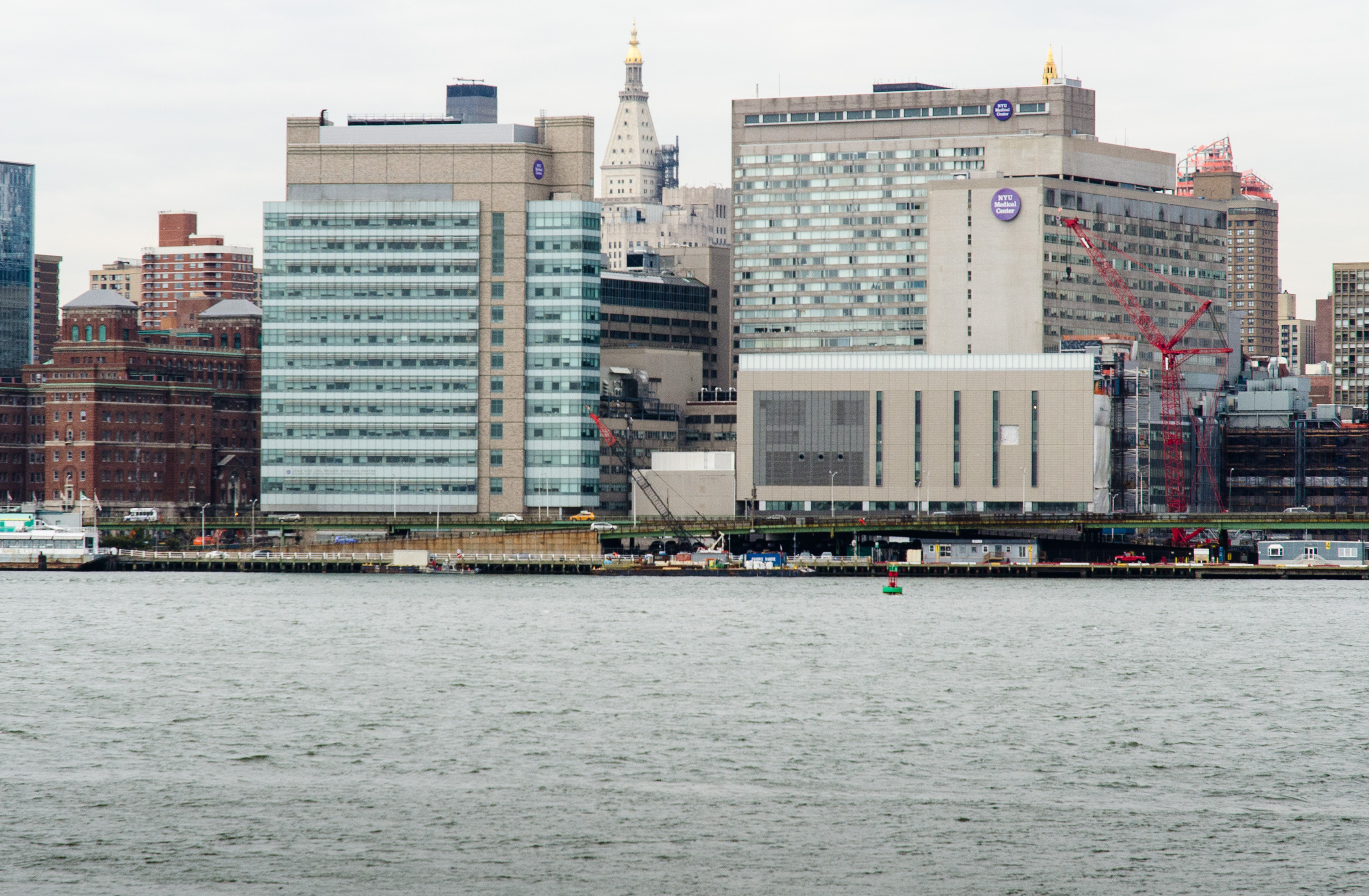
NYU Medical Center, 2014.

The Bellevue Program for Survivors of Torture (PSOT) was co-founded in 1995 by Dr. Allen Keller. Also responsible for the inception of the Bellevue Program for Survivors of Torture, were Drs. Lucia Keller, Ilene Cohen and Asher Aladjem.

Dr. Allen Keller, who serves as the executive and program director of PSOT, also works as an associate professor at New York University's School of Medicine, specialising in the dynamics between mental health and human rights. Dr. Allen Keller's academic and advocacy work, revolve around issues such as the mental and physical health of people seeking political asylum, the conditions of immigration detention within the United States, as well as the complicity in torture and human rights abuses by health care professionals.

During the years of 1985 and 1986, Dr Keller worked within a refugee camp on the Thai-Cambodian border. During his years of volunteering, Dr Keller noticed that immediate health issues came about as a result of extensive human rights abuses and trauma. It was in Cambodia that Dr Keller acquainted himself with the consequences of torture and learned to give clinical interviews and patient diagnoses.

In 1992–1993, as a member of Physicians for Human Rights, Dr. Allen Keller was invited to return to Cambodia by the United Nations Transitional Authority in Cambodia (UNTAC) and the American Refugee Committee (ARC). With the Cambodian community recovering from a long period of political and ethnic violence, Dr. Keller developed a program which aimed to provide educational services to Cambodian health professionals and increase their understanding and knowledge about human rights. Additionally, with his interests in the relationship between health and human rights, his program, in collaboration with the United Nations, sought to create an increased understanding between health care workers and their role in implementing and protecting human rights as well as in torture victim recovery. This program involved teaching a twenty-hour curriculum aimed to develop health care professionals’ ability to document the human rights abuses of victims.

During the 1990s Dr Allen Keller noticed the influx in asylum seekers seeking refuge in New York and the lack of mental health care facilities and services that were available to them. To redress similar concerns that he had during his time in Cambodia, in 1995, Dr. Allen Keller opened up the Bellevue/NYU Program for Survivors of Torture with Drs Lucia Keller, Ilene Cohen and Asher Aladjem. Making up a team of social workers, medical practitioners, psychiatrists and psychologists, with the increasing incidence of international torture and abuse, they aimed to help survivors of conflict and abuse, in post-conflict environments.

1998: The centre received an influx of Kosovar Albanians after terror and mass deportation was carried out by Serbian authorities.

1999: The program saw an increase in significant numbers of patients from Sierra Leone, following a rebel attack.

2001: Following the 9/11 attacks the centre provided psychological support and counselling to civilians who were affected.

The program now features approximately 50 staff, half of which are made up of volunteers, who work with almost 1000 patients each year. Residing in New York, they represent demographics belonging to over 80 countries.

== Mission ==
The Bellevue/NYU Program for Survivors of Torture's mission is to provide comprehensive care to victims of ethnic and political Torture and those suffering from refugee trauma. Aiming to build a program that interconnects practical medical care, with holistic mental health care and social service needs; their mission involves efforts in survivor advocacy, community outreach initiatives, research and education.

Part of their mission is for the clinicians to shape and tailor PSOT to the needs of their clients and ensure that their voices form a larger part in professional and social discourse. PSOT aims to facilitate ongoing discussion and collaborative efforts in communication to provide nuanced and effective treatment plans. The programs ultimate goal is to see individual survivors being able to enjoy healthy and fulfilled lives within the United States. Additionally, the Bellevue/NYU Program for Survivors of Torture hopes to contribute to global efforts in reducing the use of torture.

== Organisational structure ==
The Bellevue Program for Survivors of Torture operates as an independent nonprofit organization which is governed by a board and executive leadership. The program is also supported by additional staff and volunteers, bringing an approximate total of employees to 50. The program is funded through its various funding sources such as the government, through partnerships, foundations and individual donations (PSOT website).

=== Board ===
Chair, Shari Soward - RBC Wealth Management

Board Member, Jeffrey D. Robinson

Board Member, Chui-Lai Cheung

=== Executive Leadership ===
Asher Aladjem, MD, Chief Psychiatrist:

Dr Asher Aladjem is both a co-founder and chief psychiatrist at PSOT. Having practised as a medical practitioner and psychiatrist for the majority of his professional career, Dr Aladjem provides both psychiatric care to patients within the program and oversees the psychiatric care given by other practitioners at PSOT.

Additionally, he is the director of psychosomatic medicine at Bellevue Hospital Centre and New York University, and specialises in adult psychiatry consults.

Caroline Albanese, Director of Operations:

As the director of operations, Caroline Albanese's role is focused on maintaining and organising the standard of care that patients receive at the Bellevue/NYU Program for Survivors of Torture. Beyond this the director of operations is in charge of coordinating staff, preparing the global budget of approximately US$2 million and individual grant budgets for the centre, as well as monitor fundraising initiatives.

Allen Keller, MD, Founder.

Sarah Moore, MD, Primary Care Liaison:

Dr Sarah Moore has been serving as the director of primary care of Thee Bellevue/NYU Program for Survivors of Torture since 2015. Her work at the clinic involves her professional interests of cultural sensitivity education, mental health and behavioural change.

Hawthorne Smith, PhD, Director:

Dr Hawthorne Smith is a licensed clinical psychologist and is the clinical/program director of PSOT. As the programs director, his duties include the overall administration of PSOT, overseeing the fundraising and budget, and the daily operations of the clinic.

Receiving his PhD in counseling psychology from Columbia University, Dr Smith is an associate professor at New York University School of Medicine. He specialises in human rights and forensic evaluations.

John Wilkinson, MA, Legal Services Manager:

The legal services manager's role at the Bellevue Program for Survivors of Torture is responsible for managing and aiding clients with legal issues and applications on asylum, permanent residency, employment, family reunification as well as organizing travel documentation for refugees. Within the clinic, the legal services manager also provides legal training and induction sessions to fellow staff members and prospective clients.

== Services ==
The Bellevue/NYU Program for Survivors of Torture offers a variety of rehabilitative services to clients and their families. The ethos of their approach is to acknowledge the natural coping mechanisms that have allowed survivors to overcome their victimization. PSOT aims to do this through symptom reduction and assisting them with community and living adjustments. Medical, legal, social, and mental direct services are readily available at the clinic.

=== Medical ===
Located within Bellevue Hospital Center, clients are encouraged to see primary care physicians. Medical services are tailored by the hospital resources to meet the varied needs of patients. Based on the primary care medical clinic, patients have access to specialty clinics such as dermatology, neurology, ophthalmology, orthopedics and gynaecology. Paediatric services are also provided for the children of the clinics’ survivors as well as children who have experienced torture against them. Other in-patient services include access to emergency care, laboratory and radiographic services. Providing clients with physical medical assessments, the center also emphasises the use of mental-health assessments, particularly when patients are coming from regions and demographics where mental health is stigmatised.

=== Mental ===
The Bellevue Program for Survivors of Torture boasts a team of mental health professionals including two attending psychiatrists, seven clinical psychologists and supervisors as well as twenty psychology interns and volunteers. The program has aimed to address mental health concerns through a multidisciplinary treatment approach. The program considers the client's total experience to tailor a treatment plan and therapeutic services to them. Direct services made available to all patients includes group therapy which is focused on helping patients adjust to their new living environments, psychiatry for patients who need psychiatric and psychopharmacological support and individual psychotherapy. Additional services also include art therapy and therapeutic yoga.

=== Social ===
At the Bellevue Program for Survivors of Torture, the social services coordinator supports clients in providing them with basic everyday needs and services. Social support is provided in six key areas at PSOT. These six key areas include access to housing support, food security, enrolment into health insurance, English language classes, LGBTQ services and clothing. PSOT has worked in collaboration with community-based organisations such as the American Friends Service Committee, the African Services Committee, Mah We Yone as well as Catholic Charities USA. The people providing these services make up a team of social work interns and externs, volunteer educators, nurses students and volunteers.

=== Legal ===
The legal services at PSOT provided pro-bono legal advice and support in all aspects of immigration and for those who have legally obtained asylum status. PSOT works with many non-profit organisations such as Human Rights First, the New York City Bar Association, the Catholic Legal Immigration Network, the New York Association for New Americans and the Hebrew Immigrant Aid Society. Alongside these organisations PSOT work towards family reunification, and obtaining legal employment authorization for their clients. Additionally when necessary staff at PSOT can provide references and medical and psychological affidavits and represent them in legal matters involving asylum-seeking.
