= Fracture blister =

Medical condition in skin overlying a fractured bone

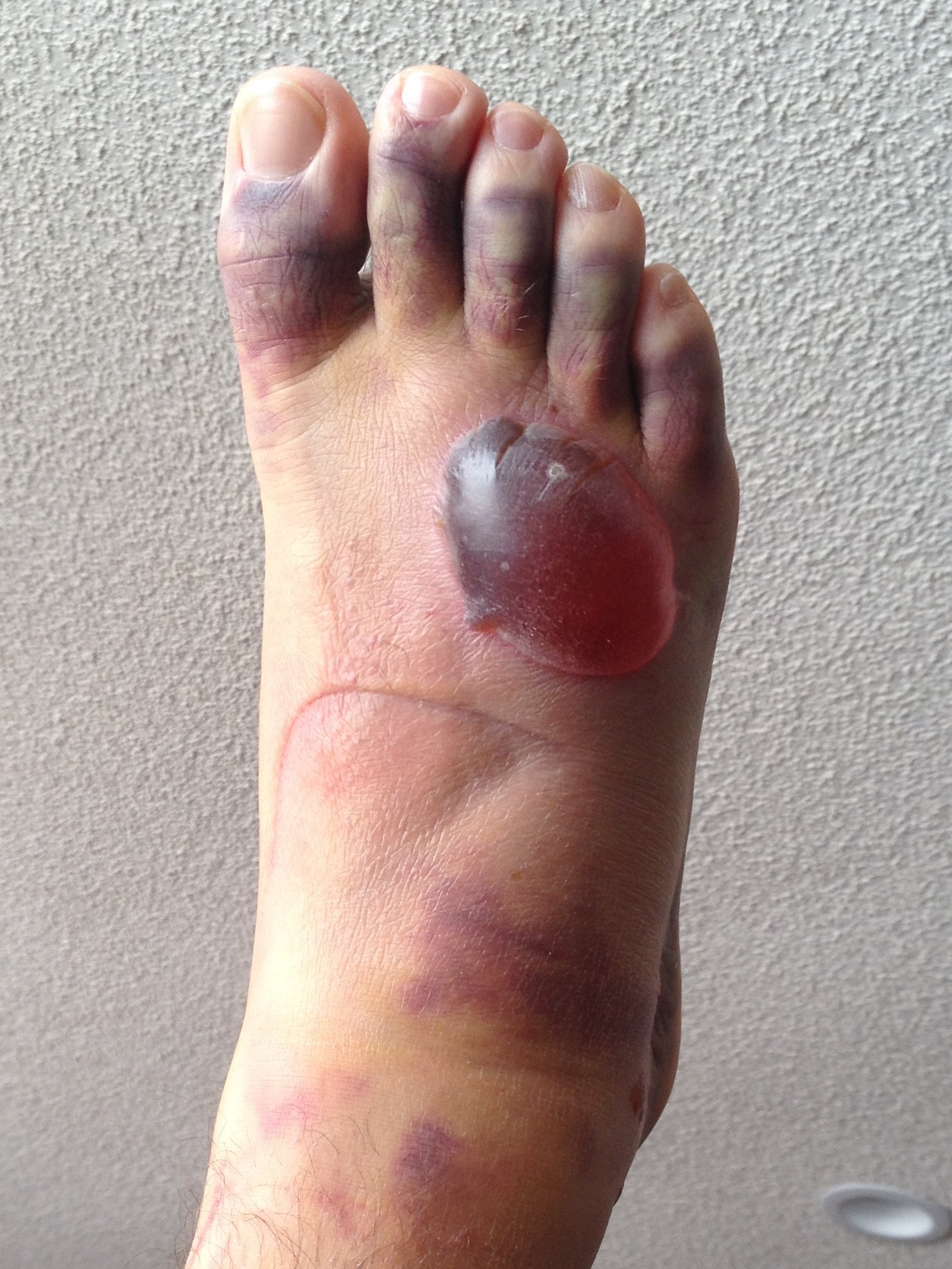
- Example of fracture blister
- Specialty: Dermatology

A fracture blister is a blister on skin overlying a fractured bone. Fractures complicated by the development of overlying blisters present a clinical dilemma in orthopedics.

== Description ==
Fracture blisters are tense vesicles or bullae that arise on markedly swollen skin directly overlying a fracture. Fracture blisters pop up in trauma patients, but are relatively rare and only occur in 2.9% of patients with a fracture requiring hospitalization. A fracture blister typically occurs near fractures where the skin has little subcutaneous tissue between it and bone. These include elbows, knees, ankles, and wrists. They tend to complicate fracture management because they interfere with splinting, casting, and incision planning for open reduction procedures. They can appear anytime within the first 6-8 hours following an injury, and most appear within the first 24-48 hours.

At the location of the fracture, there is an increase in compartment pressure that is found around the area in limbs where blisters do not form. It is presumed that the formation of the blisters relieves some of the myofascial pressure. It can be noted that there is a decreased number of tight junctions and activation of the paracellular pathway in the blistered skin, allowing for fluid passage into the blister.

These blisters are thought to be caused by shearing forces applied at the time of injury. When the bones are broken and deform from their normal shape, the attached skin is then strained to a predictable degree which can be calculated using a formula that takes into account the angle of deformation and the start and end lengths of the area of skin being measured. The shearing and subsequent strain is a result of the difference in elasticity between the dermis and epidermis.

There are two types, clear fluid and hemorrhagic, and the difference is found in the level of the shear. Clear fluid blisters separate layers within the epidermis, and hemorrhagic blisters separate at the dermal-epidermal junction. It was found that a strain of 152% generated enough force to shear the skin layers and cause the formation of a hemorrhagic blister. Hemorrhagic blisters are more serious as they represent a complete stripping of epidermal cells. Clinically, the type of blister determines the healing time; clear blisters take about 12 days and hemorrhagic blisters heal in about 16 days.

Risk factors that predispose a patient to formation of a blister include but are not limited to: anatomical sites with thin and tightly adhered overlying skin, peripheral vascular disease, collagen vascular disease, hypertension, smoking, alcoholism, diabetes mellitus, lymphatic obstruction, high energy injuries, and grade I and II open tibia fractures.

Repair of the fracture prior to the formation of a blister is most ideal option. However, if that cannot be done, decision to pop the blisters in order to treat the fracture or wait for them to heal first usually hinges on the preferences of the orthopaedic surgeon as there is a lack of data on what treatment is ideal. Waiting delays care an average of 7 days, and longer for tibial plateau and calcaneal fractures. Operating immediately anecdotally increases wound infection rates.

== Gallery ==
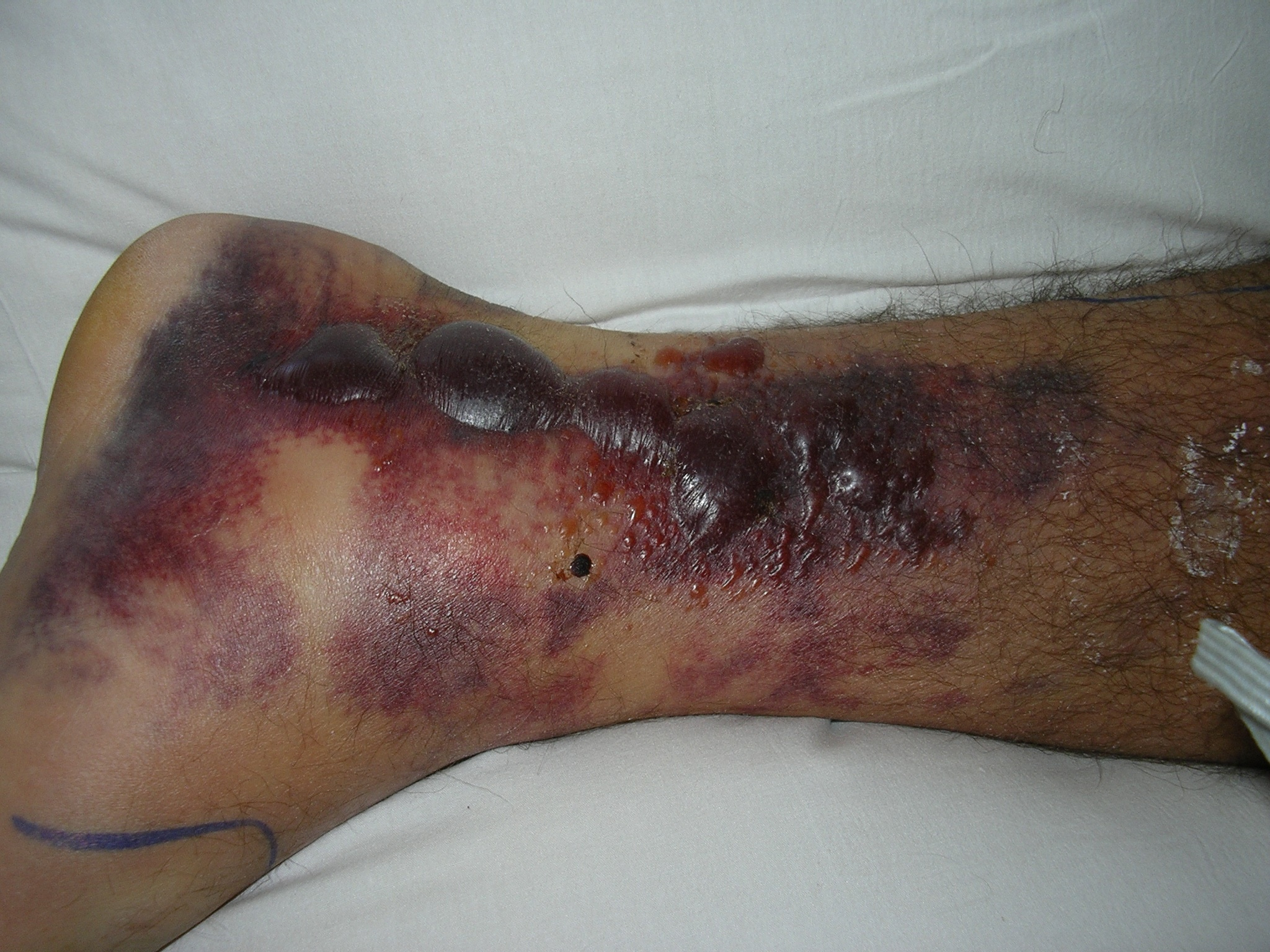
Hemorrhagic fracture blisters on medial aspect of left foot and ankle. X-ray shows a Weber type B fracture of the ankle
