= Inferior transverse ligament =

Inferior transverse ligament can refer to:

- Inferior transverse ligament of scapula
- Inferior transverse ligament of the tibiofibular syndesmosis
