= Destot =

Destot (English: /dɛˈstoʊ/, French: [desto]) is a French surname. Notable people with the surname include:

- Étienne Destot (1864–1918), French radiologist and anatomist
- Michel Destot (born 1946), French politician

== See also ==
- Destot's sign
- Destot's space
