= Anterior inferior =

Anterior inferior may refer to:

- Anterior inferior cerebellar artery
- Anterior inferior iliac spine
- Anterior tibiofibular ligament
- Anterior inferior pancreaticoduodenal artery
