= Lauge-Hansen classification =

Method to classify an ankle fracture

The Lauge-Hansen classification is a system of categorizing ankle fractures based on the foot position and the force applied.

== Classification ==
The following types of ankle fractures are classified within the Lauge-Hansen system:

Grade	Sequence	Example
Supination-Adduction	1. Anterior talofibular ligament sprain or distal fibular avulsion fracture 2. Vertical medial malleolus fracture and impaction of anteromedial distal tibia	Supination-adduction ankle fracture-dislocation
Supination-External rotation	1. Anterior inferior tibiofibular ligament sprain 2. Lateral short oblique fibular fracture (anteroinferior to posterosuperior); 3. Posterior inferior tibiofibular ligament rupture or avulsion of posterior malleolus 4. Medial malleolus transverse fracture or disruption of deltoid ligament	Supination-external rotation ankle fracture-dislocation
Pronation-Abduction	1. Medial malleolus transverse fracture or disruption of deltoid ligament 2. Anterior inferior tibiofibular ligament sprain 3. Transverse comminuted fracture of the fibula above the level of the syndesmosis	Pronation-abduction ankle fracture-dislocation
Pronation-External rotation	1. Medial malleolus transverse fracture or disruption of deltoid ligament 2. Anterior inferior tibiofibular ligament disruption 3. Lateral short oblique or spiral fracture of fibula (anterosuperior to posteroinferior) above the level of the joint 4. Posterior inferior tibiofibular ligament rupture or avulsion of posterior malleolus	Pronation-external rotation ankle fracture-dislocation

== See also ==
- Danis–Weber classification
- Herscovici classification
