= Jules Germain François Maisonneuve =

French surgeon

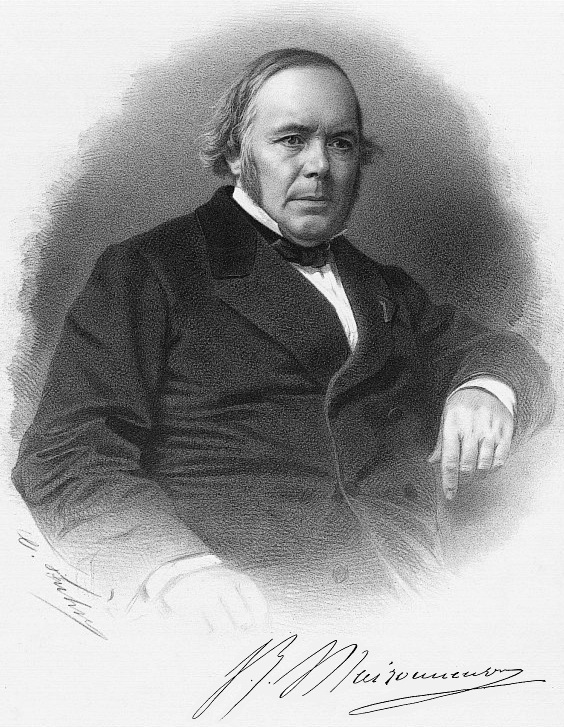
Jules Germain François Maisonneuve

Jules Germain Francois Maisonneuve (10 December 1809 – 9 April 1897) was a French surgeon and student of Guillaume Dupuytren. Maisonneuve is notable as the first surgeon to explain the role of external rotation in the production of ankle fractures. The eponymously named Maisonneuve fracture describes a specific fibular fracture.

== Publications ==
- Maisonneuve, J. G. (1840). Recherches sur la fracture du péroné. Paris. France: Loquin & Cie.
- Maisonneuve, Jules and Cunasc, Laurent (1847). La Société nationale de Chirurgie, ses travaux et ses membres. Th. Bonet. Paris.
