= Fibular notch =

Indentation

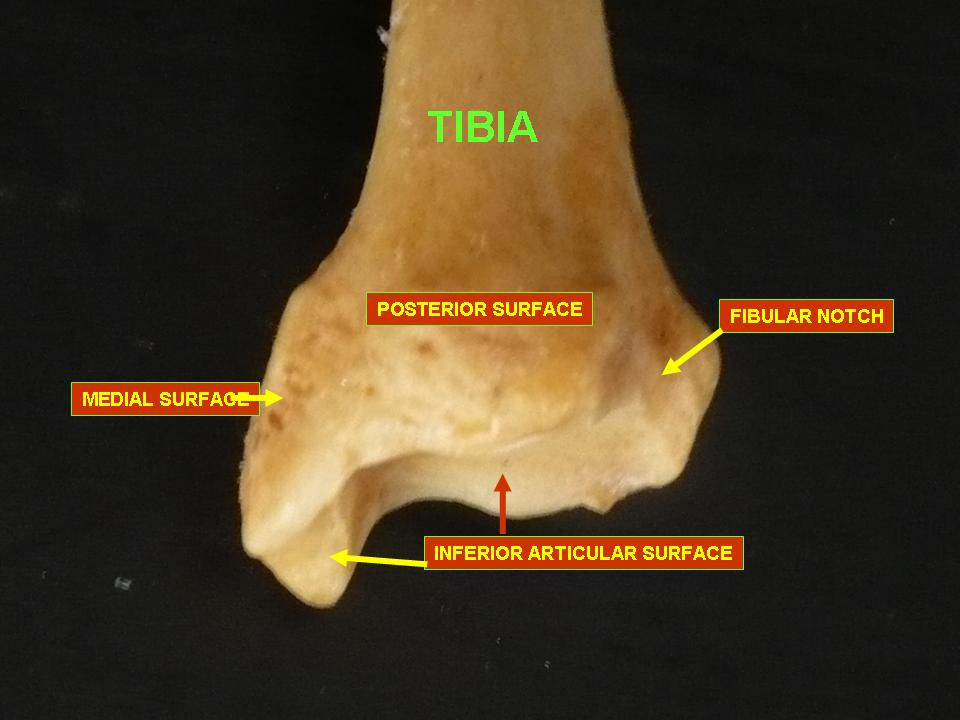
- Right tibia, posterior view. Fibular notch.

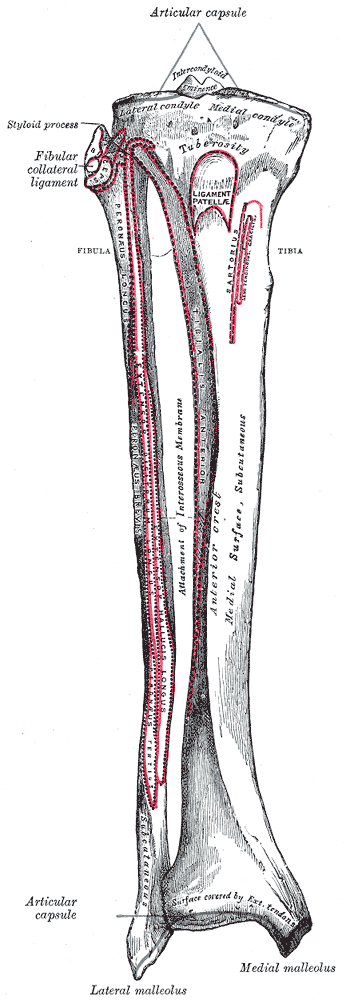
- Bones of the right leg. Anterior surface.

Details

Identifiers
- Latin: incisura fibularis tibiae
- TA98: A02.5.06.023
- TA2: 1425
- FMA: 43835

The fibular notch of the tibia is an indentation at the inferior portion of the tibia where it articulates with the fibula to form the inferior tibiofibular articulation.

== Additional images ==
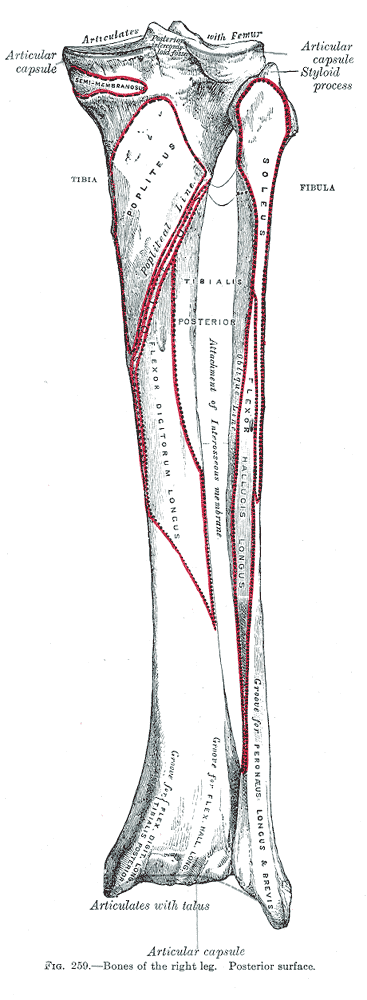
Bones of the right leg. Posterior surface.
