= Inferior transverse ligament of the tibiofibular syndesmosis =

Connective tissue

The inferior transverse ligament of the tibiofibular syndesmosis is a connective tissue structure in the lower leg that lies in front of the posterior ligament. It is a strong, thick band, of yellowish fibers which passes transversely across the back of the ankle joint, from the lateral malleolus to the posterior border of the articular surface of the tibia, almost as far as its malleolar process.

This ligament projects below the margin of the bones, and forms part of the articulating surface for the talus.

It is not included in Terminologia Anatomica, but it still appears in some anatomy textbooks.
