= Malunion =

- Specialty: Orthopedics

A malunion is when a fractured bone does not heal properly. Some ways that it shows is by having the bone being twisted, shorter, or bent. Malunions can occur by having the bones improperly aligned when immobilized, having the cast taken off too early, or never seeking medical treatment after the break. Malunions are painful and commonly produce swelling around the area, possible immobilization, and deterioration of the bone and tissue.

== Signs and symptoms ==
Malunions are presented by excessive swelling, twisting, bending, and possibly shortening of the bone. Patients may have trouble placing weight on or near the malunion.

== Diagnosis ==
An X-ray is essential for the proper diagnosis of a malunion. The doctor will look into the patient’s history and the treatment process for the bone fracture. Oftentimes a CT scan and probably an MRI are also used in diagnosis. MRI are used to check of cartilage and ligament issues that developed due to the malunion and misalignment. CT scans are used to locate normal or abnormal structures within the body and to help during procedures to guide the placement of instruments and/or treatments.

== Treatment ==
Once diagnosed and located, surgery is the most common treatment for a malunion. The surgery consists of the surgeon re-breaking the bone and realigning it to the anatomically correct position. There are different types and levels of severity for malunions which helps determine the treatment. Most often, either screws, plates or pins are used to secure the new alignment. In some cases, the bone may be trimmed to allow full orientation at the fractured spot. It is also possible that a bone graft could be used to help with healing.

During follow ups an X-ray or a CT scan may be used to verify that the fracture is healing properly and is now in the anatomically correct position.

== See also ==
- Monteggia fracture
- Duverney fracture
- Clavicle fracture
