= Étienne Destot =

French radiologist, anatomist and accomplished sculptor (1864-1918)

The space in the wrist bounded by the hamate, capitate, triquetral and lunate bones. This place is referred to as a place where the nails of Jesus Christ crucifixion pierced his wrist.

Étienne Destot (English: /dɛˈstoʊ/ deh-STOH, French: [etjɛn desto]; 1 March 1864 – 3 December 1918) was a French radiologist and anatomist who was a native of Dijon. He studied medicine in Lyon, and later worked in the hospitals of Hôtel Dieu, Croix-Rousse and Charité in Lyon. In addition to his work in medicine, he was an accomplished sculptor.

Destot was a pioneer in the field of radiology. In February 1896, less than two months after Wilhelm Conrad Röntgen (1845–1923) announced his discovery of the X-ray, Destot was making radiographs of patients at the Hôtel-Dieu de Lyon. He made thousands of radiographies, many of which were of patients supplied by surgeon Louis Léopold Ollier (1830–1900). In 1913, due to severe radiation damage to his hands, he was forced to relinquish his position as radiologist.

Destot also made contributions in the field of orthopedics, and in 1911 is credited as being the first physician to use the term pilon in orthopedic literature. He was a medical officer during World War I, and died from illness in Châtillon-sur-Seine in 1918.

His name is included on the Monument to the X-ray and Radium Martyrs of All Nations erected in Hamburg, Germany in 1936.

== Associated eponym ==
- "Destot's space", also known as "Destot's gap": a space in the wrist bounded by the hamate, capitate, triquetral and lunate bones.
