= Posterior colliculus =

The posterior colliculus is the posterior portion of the medial malleolus of the distal tibia which is smaller in size comparing to the anterior colliculus. It has an attachment of the posterior tibiotalar ligament which is a part of deltoid ligament on the medial side of the ankle.
