= Pilon fracture =

- Other names: Plafond fracture
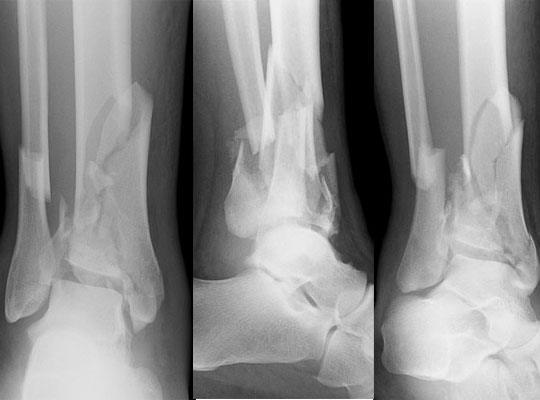
- X-ray of a fracture involving the articular surface of the Tibia
- Specialty: Orthopedic surgery

A pilon fracture is a fracture of the distal part of the tibia, involving its articular surface at the ankle joint. Pilon fractures are caused by rotational or axial forces, mostly as a result of falls from a height or motor vehicle accidents. Pilon fractures are rare, comprising 3 to 10 percent of all fractures of the tibia and 1 percent of all lower extremity fractures, but they involve a large part of the weight-bearing surface of the tibia in the ankle joint. Because of this, they may be difficult to fixate and are historically associated with high rates of complications and poor outcome.

Pilon is the French word for "pestle" and was introduced into orthopedic literature in 1911 by pioneer French radiologist Étienne Destot.

== Classification ==
Pilon fractures are categorized by two main X-ray schemes, Ruedi-Allgower classification system. and Müller AO Classification of fractures.

== Treatment ==
The treatment of pilon fractures depends on the extent of the injury. This includes the involvement of other bones such as the fibula and the talus, involvement of soft tissue, and the fracture pattern. Treatment strategies and fixation methods used include internal and external fixation, as well as staged approaches, with the aim of reducing the fracture, reconstructing the involved bones and restoration of articular surface congruence, with minimal insult to soft tissues. Appropriate wound management is important to reduce the high rate of infectious complications and secondary wound healing problems associated with open pilon fractures. Vacuum-assisted wound closure therapy and using a staged protocol (awaiting soft-tissue recovery before extensive reconstructive efforts) may play a positive role.

== See also ==
- Ankle fracture
