= Catholic Legal Immigration Network =

American nonprofit organization

Catholic Legal Immigration Network, Inc.
- Company type: Non-Profit
- Founded: 1988
- Founder: USCCB
- Headquarters: 8757 Georgia Avenue; Silver Spring, MD 20910
- Revenue: 9,880,635 United States dollar (2017)
- Total assets: 14,287,900 United States dollar (2022)
- Website: cliniclegal.org

Catholic Legal Immigration Network, Inc., commonly referred to as CLINIC, is the US's largest network of non-profit immigration activist programs. In its 1986 pastoral statement "Together a New People", the United States Conference of Catholic Bishops (USCCB) observed that the church's ministry to immigrants reflects the "biblical understanding of the justice of God reaching out to all peoples and rectifying the situation of the poor, the orphans, the widows, the disadvantaged, and especially in the Old Testament, the alien and the stranger." Two years later, USCCB established CLINIC as a legally distinct 501(c)(3) non-profit organization to support a rapidly growing need for community-based programs dedicated to serve indigent and low-income immigrants. CLINIC's network originally comprised seventeen diocesan affiliates and has since increased to over 200 Catholic and community-based immigration programs with 290 field offices in 47 states, Washington, D.C., and Puerto Rico. In addition, the network affiliates employ roughly 1,200 Board of Immigration Appeals (BIA) accredited attorneys who serve over 600,000 low-income immigrants each year. CLINIC affiliated agencies represent low-income immigrants without reference to their race, religion, gender, ethnic group, or other distinguishing characteristics.

== Mission statement ==
"Embracing the Gospel value of welcoming the stranger, CLINIC promotes the dignity and protects the rights of immigrants in partnership with a dedicated network of Catholic and community legal immigration programs."

== Programs ==
- National Legal Center for Immigrants: The National Legal Center works to expand the availability of professional, low-cost immigration services by providing legal expertise, training and technical assistance to CLINIC's member agencies and constituents. Attorneys from the National Legal Center provide legal advice to more than 1,000 nonprofit, community-based immigration service providers through phone consultations, multi-day trainings, broadcast e-mails, and a variety of publications. Its success in delivering legal support to this expanding network has made CLINIC widely recognized as the most productive legal support group in the field.
- Center for Citizenship and Immigrant Communities: The Center for Citizenship and Immigrant Communities strengthens immigrant rights community by preparing charitable immigration programs to expand their service-delivery capacity and establishing a coordinated service-delivery and legal support architecture. Through its various projects, the Center for Citizenship and Immigrant Communities seeks to develop capacity for lasting change by working with a cross-section of national and regional groups in under-served communities, (whether geographic, ethnic, or population-specific communities) to start or improve existing programs that will allow millions of immigrants throughout the United States to understand and to exercise their rights.
- Center for Immigrant Rights: The Center for Immigrant Rights tackles problems faced by low-income immigrants and CLINIC member agencies that can only be resolved through advocacy, education, pro bono representation, litigation, and media. The Center identifies legal trends and issues affecting immigrants and pursues responsive solutions. The Center prioritizes its advocacy agenda in concert with its member agencies. It also collaborates with Migration and Refugee Services of the United States Conference of Catholic Bishops (USCCB). At the national level, the Center for Immigrant Rights focuses on administrative advocacy with officials at the Department of Homeland Security (DHS) and the Executive Office for Immigration Review (EOIR). At the local level, the Center supports the efforts of advocates working to combat state and local anti-immigrant measures. To increase representation to detained immigrants, the Center coordinates the Board of Immigration Appeals Pro Bono Project. Because documentation and media coverage of the human impact of U.S. immigration policies are crucial to advocacy efforts that seek to create a more just immigration system, the Center documents and facilitates media coverage of the challenges facing immigrants served by its network. It also provides support to its member and colleague agencies engaged in media outreach.
- Center for Religious Immigration and Protection: As the number of foreign-born Catholics immigrating to the United States continues to steadily increase, the number of U.S. men and women entering the seminary or religious life continues to steadily decrease. In light of this reality, the Church is bringing foreign-born religious workers into the United States to address the growing need for spiritual and pastoral ministry to foreign-born and U.S. Catholics. The Center for Religious Immigration and Protection assists more than 250 archdiocese, dioceses and religious institutes to bring foreign-born religious workers to the U.S. for education, formation, or ministry. The Center offers a variety of legal and educational services that enable CLINIC to fulfill its mission to enhance, extend, and support the legal immigration work of the Catholic Church.

== Board of directors ==
- The Most Reverend Richard J. Garcia, D. D.
  - President, Bishop of Diocese of Monterey
- Most Reverend Anthony Taylor
  - Vice President, Bishop of Little Rock
- Sr. Sally Duffy, SC
  - Treasurer, President & Executive Director, SC Ministry Foundation, Inc.
- Most Reverend Nicholas DiMarzio
  - Bishop of Brooklyn
- Sr. RayMonda DuVall, CHS
  - Executive Director, Catholic Charities of San Diego
- Most Reverend Eusebio Elizondo
  - Auxiliary Bishop of Seattle
- Most Reverend José Gomez
  - Archbishop of Los Angeles
- Ms. Marguerite (Peg) Harmon
  - Executive Director, Catholic Community Services of Southern Arizona
- Mr. James T. McGibbon
  - Managing Director, O'Meara, Ferguson, Whelan and Conway
- Most Reverend Eduardo A. Nevares
  - Auxiliary Bishop of Phoenix
- Most Reverend Joseph A. Pepe
  - Bishop of Las Vegas
- Mr. Vincent F. Pitta
  - Pitta & Gibblin LLP
- Most Reverend Kevin W. Vann
  - Bishop of Fort Worth
- Most Reverend Thomas G. Wenski
  - Archbishop of Miami
- Ms. Nancy Wisdo
  - Associate General Secretary, USCCB
- Mr. John Wilhelm
  - President - UNITE HERE
- Ambassador Johnny Young
  - Executive Director, Migration & Refugee Services
- Most Reverend Luiz Zarama
  - Auxiliary Bishop of Atlanta
