= Orthopedics (journal) =

- Discipline: Orthopedics
- Language: English
- Edited by: Robert D'Ambrosia

Publication details
- History: 1978–present
- Publisher: Slack
- Frequency: Monthly
- Impact factor: 1.463 (2017)

Standard abbreviations
- ISO 4: Orthopedics

Indexing
- ISSN: 0147-7447 (print); 1938-2367 (web)

Links
- Journal homepage; Online archive

Orthopedics is a monthly peer-reviewed medical journal covering adult and pediatric orthopedic surgery and treatment. It was established in 1978 and is published by Slack.

== History ==
The journal was established as a bimonthly journal in 1978 with H. Andrew Wissinger as founding editor-in-chief. The current editor-in-chief is Robert D'Ambrosia.

== Abstracting and indexing ==
The journal is abstracted and indexed in:

- Current Contents/Clinical Medicine
- EBSCO databases
- Embase
- MEDLINE/PubMed
- ProQuest databases
- Science Citation Index Expanded
- Scopus
- Social Sciences Citation Index

According to the Journal Citation Reports, the journal has a 2017 impact factor of 1.463.
