= Anterior colliculus =

The anterior colliculus is the anterior portion of the medial malleolus of the distal tibia, forming part of the ankle mortise. It has an attachment of the anterior tibiotalar ligament.
