= Danis–Weber classification =

Method to classify an ankle fracture

Danis–Weber classification of ankle fractures (Types A, B and C)

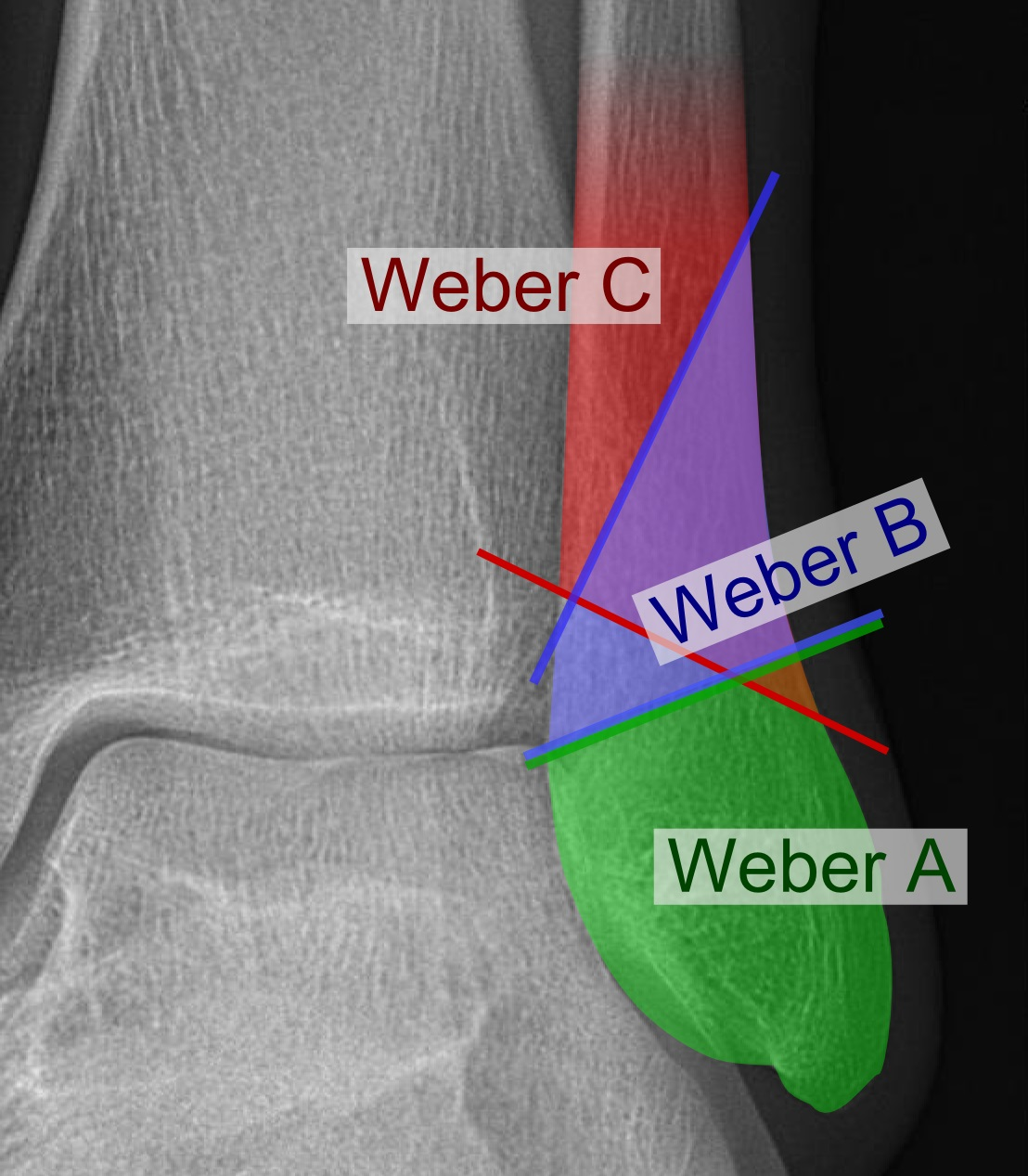
Danis–Weber classification on X-ray

The Danis–Weber classification (often known just as the Weber classification) is a method of describing ankle fractures. It has three types: A, B, and C, based upon the location of fracture of the distal fibula.

== Types ==
Type A

Fracture of the fibula distal to the tibiofibular syndesmosis (the connection between the distal ends of the tibia and fibula). Typical features:

- below level of the ankle joint
- tibiofibular syndesmosis intact
- deltoid ligament intact
- medial malleolus occasionally fractured
- usually stable: occasionally nonetheless requires an open reduction and internal fixation (ORIF) particularly if medial malleolus fractured

Type B

Fracture of the fibula at the level of the syndesmosis. Typical features:

- at the level of the ankle joint, extending superiorly and laterally up the fibula
- tibiofibular syndesmosis intact or only partially torn, but no widening of the distal tibiofibular articulation
- medial malleolus may be fractured or deltoid ligament may be torn
- variable stability

Type C

Fracture of the fibula proximal to the syndesmosis. Typical features:

- above the level of the ankle joint
- tibiofibular syndesmosis disrupted with widening of the distal tibiofibular articulation
- medial malleolus fracture or deltoid ligament injury present
- unstable: requires ORIF

Categories B and C imply a degree of damage to the syndesmosis itself (which cannot be directly visualised on X-ray). They are inherently unstable and are more likely to require operative repair to achieve a good outcome. Type A fractures are usually stable and can be managed with simple measures, such as a plaster of paris cast.

== See also ==
- Lauge-Hansen classification
