= Deltoid ligament =

Anatomical detail in the ankle

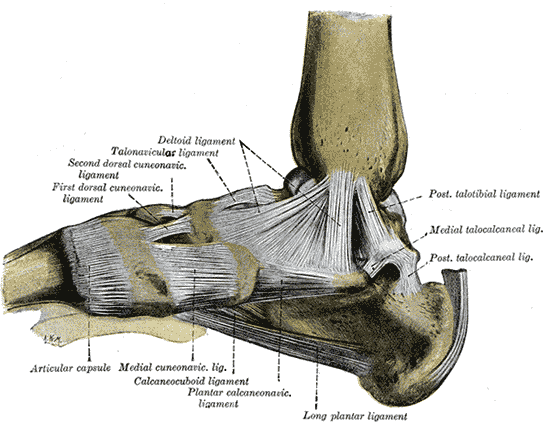
- Ligaments of the medial aspect of the foot.

Details
- From: Talus bone (tarsal bones)
- To: Medial malleolus of the tibia

Identifiers
- Latin: ligamentum collaterale mediale articulationis talocruralis, ligamentum deltoideum
- TA98: A03.6.10.003
- TA2: 1913
- FMA: 44055

The deltoid ligament (or medial ligament of talocrural joint) is a strong, flat, triangular band, attached, above, to the apex and anterior and posterior borders of the medial malleolus. The deltoid ligament supports the ankle joint and also resists excessive eversion of the foot. The deltoid ligament is composed of 4 fibers:

1. Anterior tibiotalar ligament
2. Tibiocalcaneal ligament
3. Posterior tibiotalar ligament
4. Tibionavicular ligament

It consists of two sets of fibers, superficial and deep.

== Superficial fibres ==
Of the superficial fibres,

- tibionavicular pass forward to be inserted into the tuberosity of the navicular bone, and immediately behind this they blend with the medial margin of the plantar calcaneonavicular ligament;
- tibiocalcaneal descend almost perpendicularly to be inserted into the whole length of the sustentaculum tali of the calcaneus;
- posterior tibiotalar from the posterior colliculus of the medial malleolus to the posteromedial surface of the talus

== Deep fibres ==
The deep fibres (anterior tibiotalar) are attached from the anterior colliculus of the medial malleolus to the medial talus and medial tubercle

== Coverings ==
The deltoid ligament is covered by the tendons of the tibialis posterior and flexor digitorum longus which are supplied by the tibial nerve (L4, L5, S1, S2, and S3).

== Additional images ==
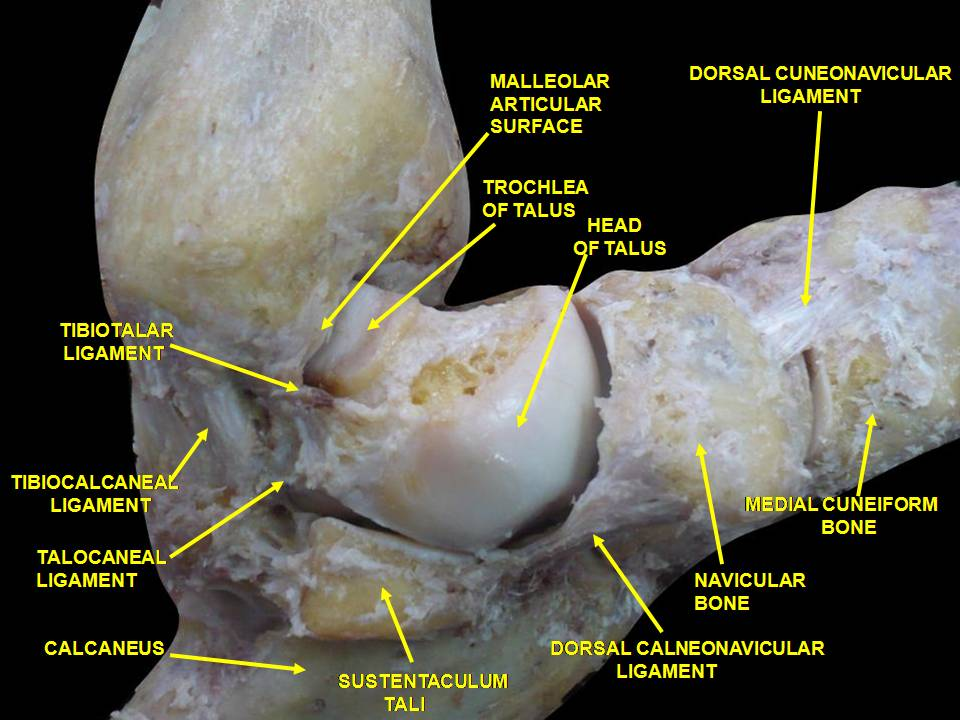
Ankle joint. Deep section.

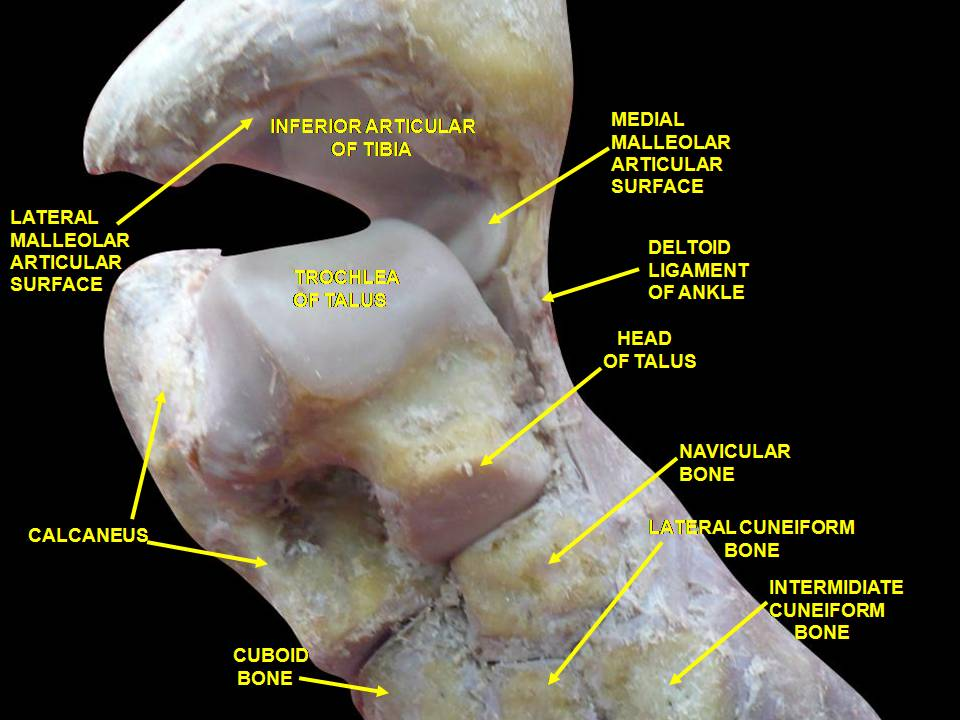
Ankle joint. Deep dissection.

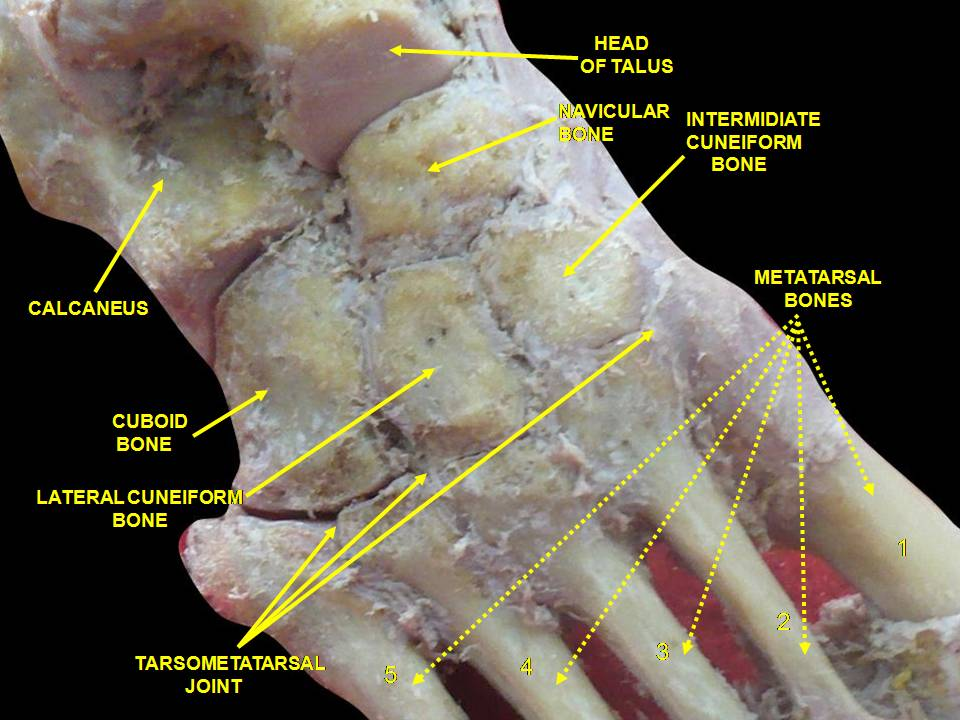
Ankle joint. Deep dissection.

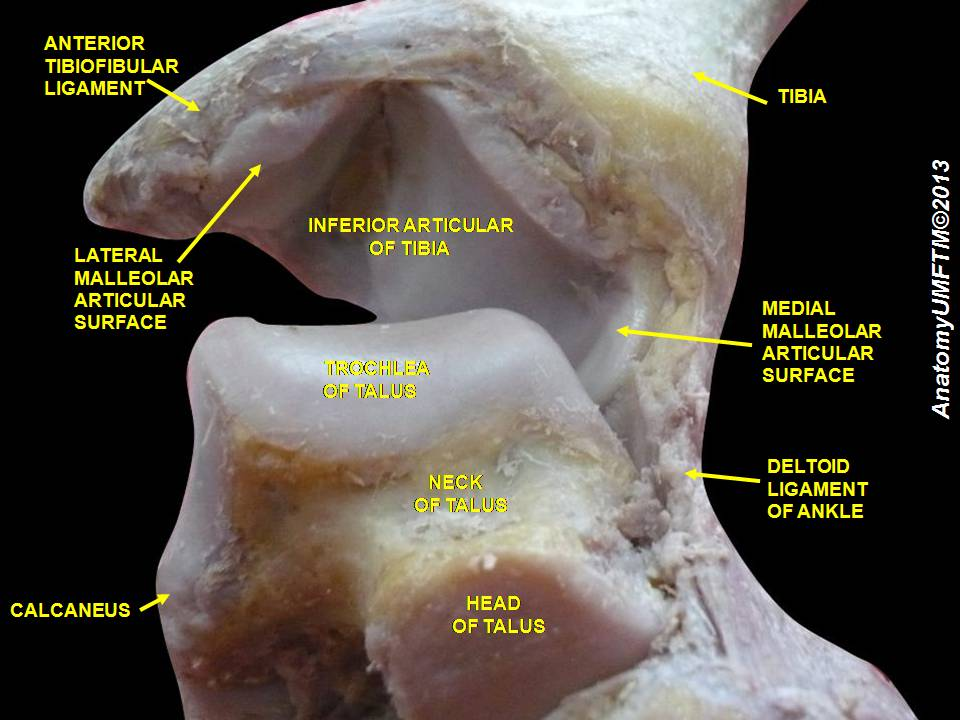
Ankle joint. Deep dissection.
