= Posterior tibiofibular ligament =

Ligament of the ankle

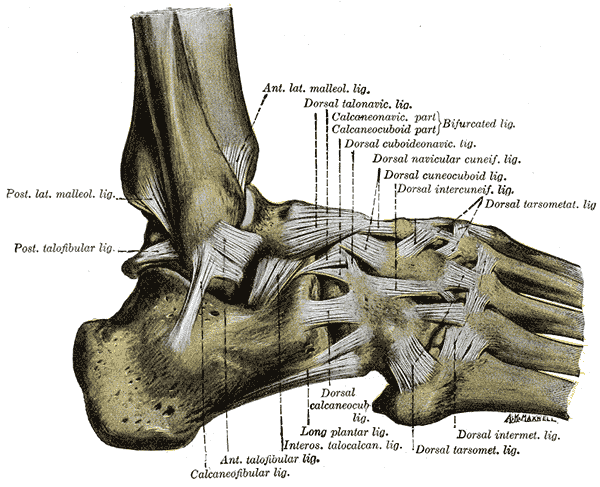
- The ligaments of the foot from the lateral aspect. (Post. lat. malleol. lig. labeled at center left.)

- Lateral view of the human ankle

Details

Identifiers
- Latin: ligamentum tibiofibulare posterius, ligamentum malleoli lateralis posterius
- TA98: A03.6.05.004
- TA2: 1870
- FMA: 76853

The posterior ligament of the lateral malleolus (posterior tibiofibular ligament, posterior inferior ligament) is smaller than the anterior ligament of the lateral malleolus and is disposed in a similar manner on the posterior surface of the syndesmosis. It connects the tibia and fibular on the inferior part of both bones.
