= Anterior tibiofibular ligament =

Ligament of the ankle

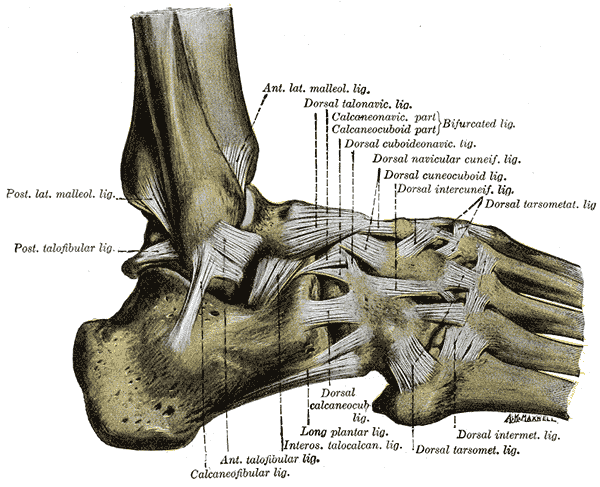
- The ligaments of the foot from the lateral aspect (anterior tibiofibular ligament labeled at center top)

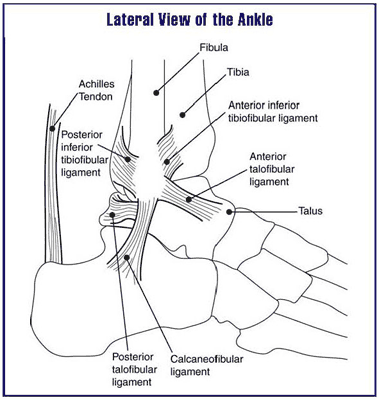
- Lateral view of the human ankle

Details

Identifiers
- Latin: ligamentum tibiofibulare anterius, ligamentum malleoli lateralis anterius
- TA98: A03.6.05.003
- TA2: 1869
- FMA: 76852

The anterior ligament of the lateral malleolus (anterior tibiofibular ligament or anterior inferior ligament) is a flat, trapezoidal band of fibers, broader below than above, which extends obliquely downward and lateralward between the adjacent margins of the tibia and fibula, on the front aspect of the syndesmosis.

It is in relation, in front, with the fibularis tertius, the aponeurosis of the leg, and the integument; behind, with the interosseous ligament; and lies in contact with the cartilage covering the talus.

== Additional images ==
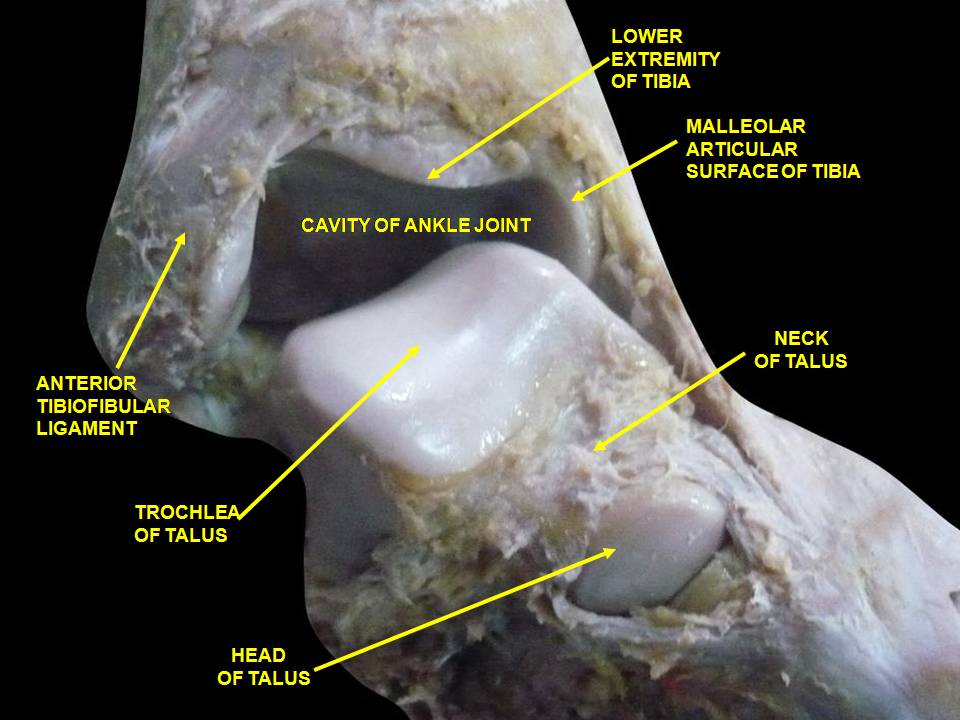
Ankle joint. Deep dissection. Anterior view.

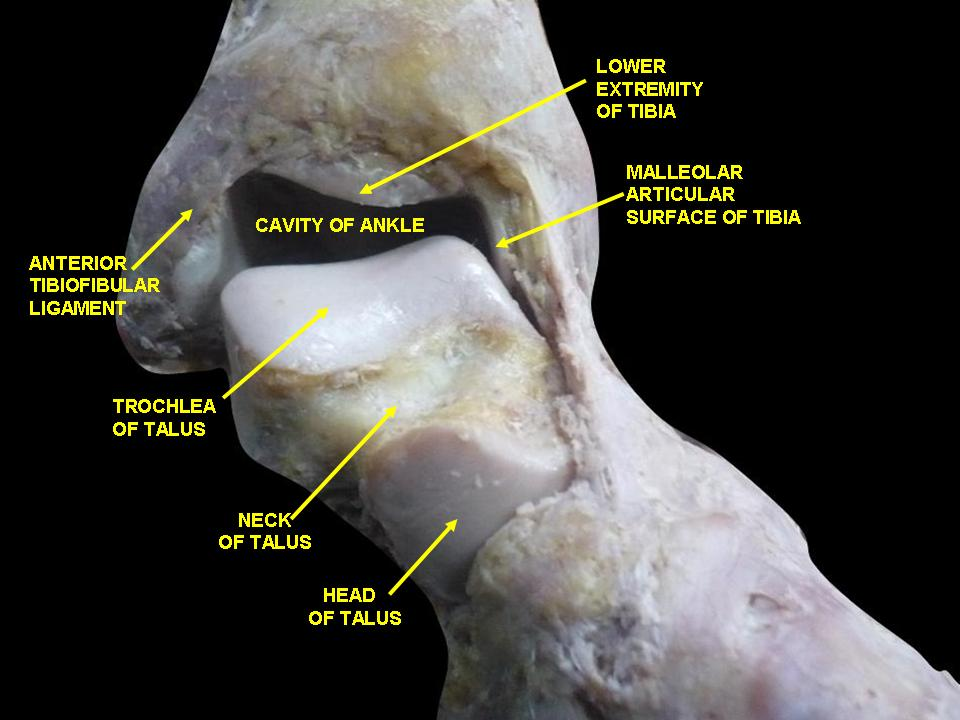
Dorsum of Foot. Ankle joint. Deep dissection

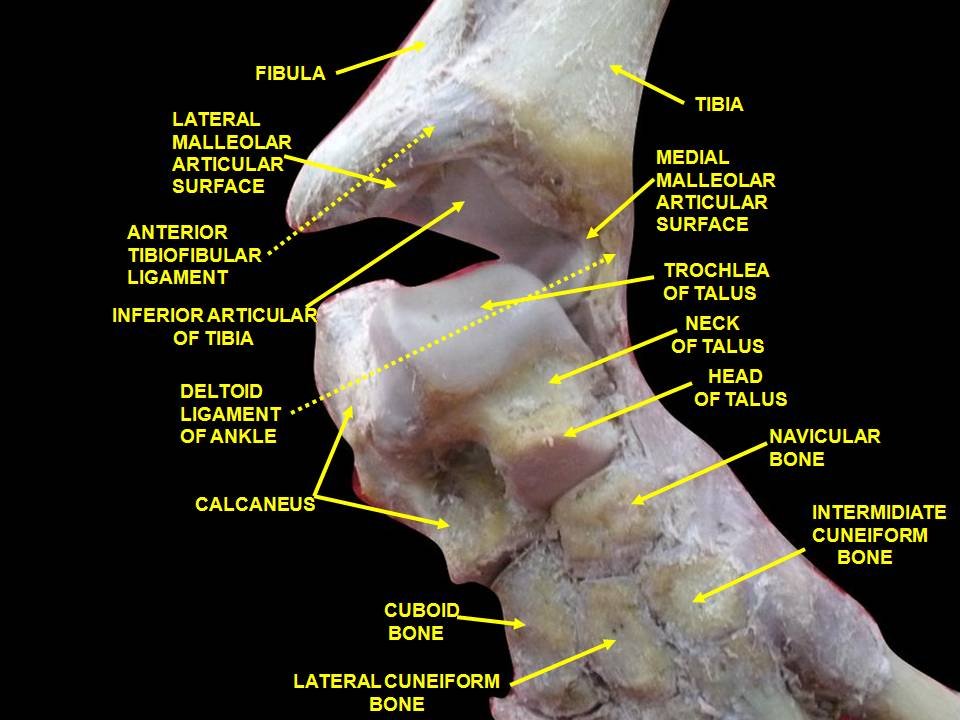
Ankle joint. Deep dissection.

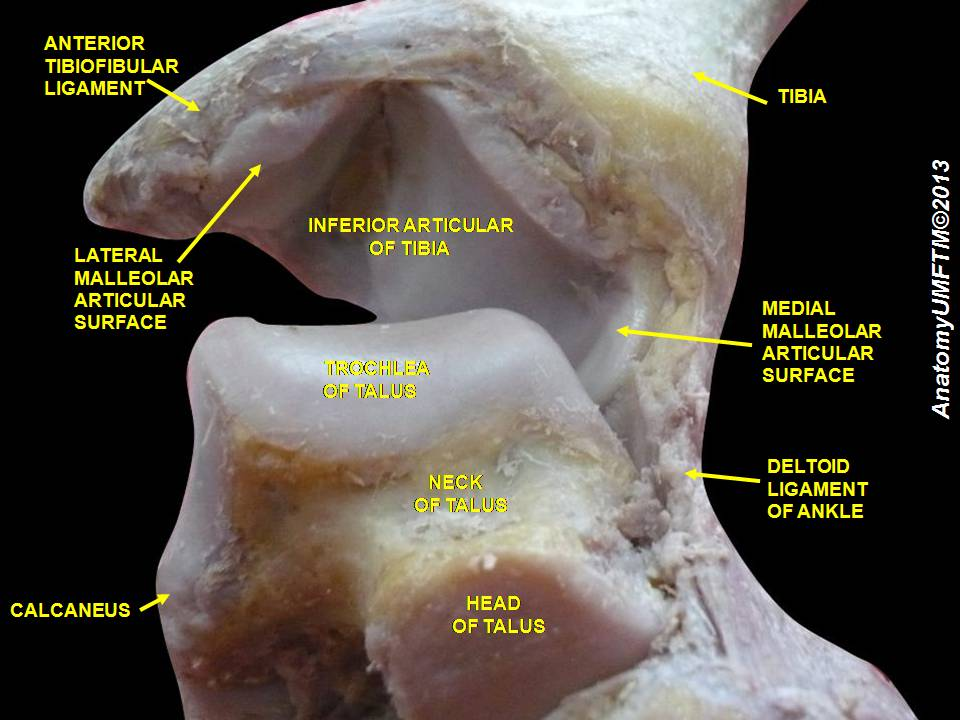
Ankle joint. Deep dissection.
