= Ottawa rules =

Ottawa rules may refer to:

- Ottawa knee rules, a set of rules used to determine whether an x-ray of the knee is needed
- Ottawa ankle rules
