= Pneumonia =

Inflammation of the alveoli of the lungs

- Other names: Pneumonitis
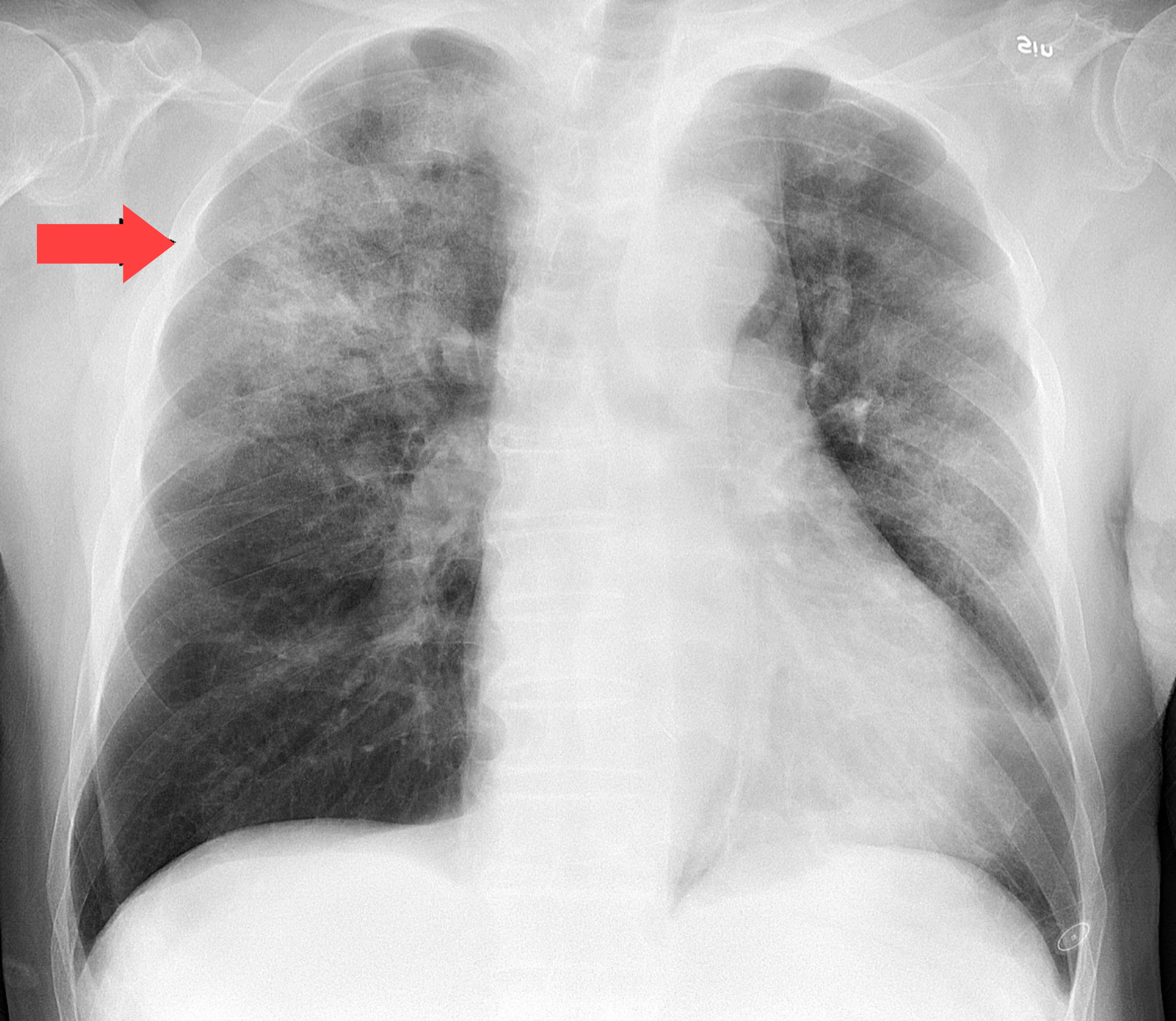
- Chest X-ray of a pneumonia caused by influenza and Haemophilus influenzae, with patchy consolidations, mainly in the right upper lobe (arrow)
- Pronunciation: /njuːˈmoʊniə/ new-MOH-nee-ə
- Specialty: Pulmonology, infectious disease
- Symptoms: Cough, shortness of breath, chest pain, fever
- Duration: Few weeks
- Causes: Bacteria, virus, aspiration
- Risk factors: Cystic fibrosis, COPD, sickle cell disease, asthma, diabetes, heart failure, history of smoking, very young age, older age
- Diagnostic method: Based on symptoms, chest X-ray
- Differential diagnosis: COPD, asthma, pulmonary edema, pulmonary embolism
- Prevention: Vaccines, handwashing, not smoking
- Medication: Antibiotics, antivirals, oxygen therapy
- Frequency: 450 million (7%) per year
- Deaths: 4 million per year

Pneumonia is an inflammatory condition of the lung primarily affecting the small air sacs known as alveoli. Symptoms typically include some combination of productive or dry cough, chest pain, fever, and difficulty breathing. The severity of the condition is variable.

It is usually caused by infection with viruses or bacteria, and less commonly by other microorganisms. (Note: The term pneumonia is sometimes more broadly applied to any condition resulting in inflammation of the lungs (caused for example by autoimmune diseases, chemical burns or certain medications), but this inflammation is more accurately referred to as pneumonitis.) Diagnosis is often based on symptoms and physical examination. Chest X-rays, blood tests, and culture of the sputum may help confirm the diagnosis. Identifying the responsible pathogen can be difficult. The disease may be classified by where it was acquired, such as community- or hospital-acquired or healthcare-associated pneumonia. Risk factors for pneumonia include cystic fibrosis, chronic obstructive pulmonary disease (COPD), sickle cell disease, asthma, diabetes, heart failure, a history of smoking, a poor ability to cough (such as following a stroke), and immunodeficiency.

Vaccines to prevent certain types of pneumonia (such as those caused by S. pneumoniae bacteria, influenza viruses, or SARS-CoV-2) are available. Other methods of prevention include hand washing to prevent infection, prompt treatment of worsening respiratory symptoms, and not smoking. Treatment depends on the underlying cause. Pneumonia believed to be due to bacteria is treated with antibiotics. If severe, the affected person is generally hospitalized. Oxygen therapy may be used if oxygen levels are low.

Each year, pneumonia affects about 450 million people globally (7% of the population) and results in about 4 million deaths. With the introduction of antibiotics and vaccines in the 20th century, survival has greatly improved. Nevertheless, pneumonia remains a leading cause of death in developing countries, and also among the very old, the very young, and the chronically ill.

Video summary (script)

== Signs and symptoms ==
Main symptoms of infectious pneumonia

People with infectious pneumonia often have a productive cough, fever accompanied by shaking chills, shortness of breath, sharp or stabbing chest pain during deep breaths, and an increased rate of breathing. In elderly people, confusion may be the most prominent sign.

The typical signs and symptoms in children under five are fever, cough, and fast or difficult breathing. Fever is not very specific, as it occurs in many other common illnesses and may be absent in those with severe disease, malnutrition or in the elderly. In addition, a cough is frequently absent in children less than 2 months old. More severe signs and symptoms in children may include blue-tinged skin, unwillingness to drink, convulsions, ongoing vomiting, extremes of temperature, or a decreased level of consciousness.

Symptom	Frequency
Cough	79–91%
Fatigue	90%
Fever	71–75%
Shortness of breath	67–75%
Sputum	60–65%
Chest pain	39–49%

Bacterial and viral cases of pneumonia usually result in similar symptoms. Some causes are associated with classic, but non-specific, clinical characteristics. Pneumonia caused by Legionella may occur with abdominal pain, diarrhea, or confusion. Pneumonia caused by Streptococcus pneumoniae is associated with rusty colored sputum. Pneumonia caused by Klebsiella may have bloody sputum often described as "currant jelly". Bloody sputum (known as hemoptysis) may also occur with tuberculosis, Gram-negative pneumonia, lung abscesses and more commonly acute bronchitis. Pneumonia caused by Mycoplasma pneumoniae may occur in association with swelling of the lymph nodes in the neck, joint pain, or a middle ear infection. Viral pneumonia presents more commonly with wheezing than bacterial pneumonia. Pneumonia was historically divided into "typical" and "atypical" based on the belief that the presentation predicted the underlying cause. However, evidence has not supported this distinction, therefore it is no longer emphasized.

== Cause ==
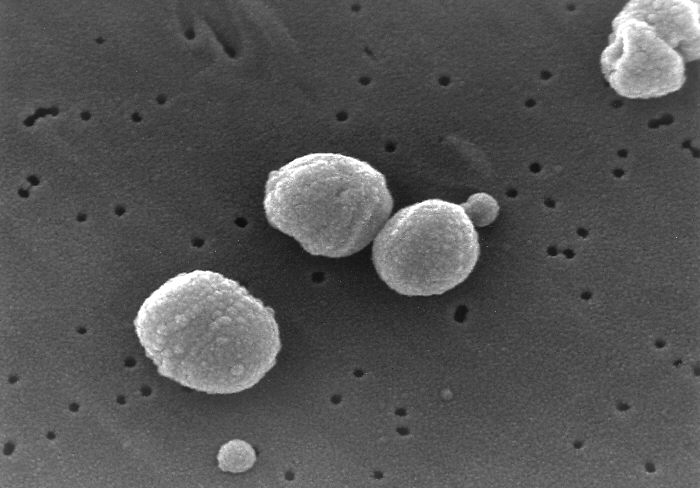
The bacterium Streptococcus pneumoniae, a common cause of pneumonia, imaged by an electron microscope

Pneumonia is due to infections caused primarily by bacteria or viruses and less commonly by fungi and parasites. Although more than 100 strains of infectious agents have been identified, only a few are responsible for the majority of cases. Mixed infections with both viruses and bacteria may occur in roughly 45% of infections in children and 15% of infections in adults. A causative agent may not be isolated in about half of cases despite careful testing. In an active population-based surveillance for community-acquired pneumonia requiring hospitalization in five hospitals in Chicago and Nashville from January 2010 through June 2012, 2259 patients were identified who had radiographic evidence of pneumonia and specimens that could be tested for the responsible pathogen. Most patients (62%) had no detectable pathogens in their sample, and unexpectedly, respiratory viruses were detected more frequently than bacteria. Specifically, 23% had one or more viruses, 11% had one or more bacteria, 3% had both bacterial and viral pathogens, and 1% had a fungal or mycobacterial infection. "The most common pathogens were human rhinovirus (in 9% of patients), influenza virus (in 6%), and Streptococcus pneumoniae (in 5%)."

The term pneumonia is sometimes more broadly applied to any condition resulting in inflammation of the lungs (caused for example by autoimmune diseases, chemical burns or drug reactions); however, this inflammation is more accurately referred to as pneumonitis.

Factors that predispose to pneumonia include smoking, immunodeficiency, alcoholism, chronic obstructive pulmonary disease, sickle cell disease (SCD), asthma, chronic kidney disease, liver disease, and biological aging. Additional risks in children include not being breastfed, exposure to cigarette smoke and other air pollution, malnutrition, and poverty. The use of acid-suppressing medications – such as proton-pump inhibitors or H2 blockers – is associated with an increased risk of pneumonia. Approximately 10% of people who require mechanical ventilation develop ventilator-associated pneumonia, and people with a gastric feeding tube have an increased risk of developing aspiration pneumonia. Moreover, the misplacement of a feeding tube can lead to aspiration pneumonia. In May 2022, the FDA issued a Class I recall of Avanos Medical's CORTRAK 2 Enteral Access System, a feeding-tube placement device, after receiving reports since 2015 of misplacement-related injuries—including cases of aspiration pneumonia—linked to 60 injuries and 23 deaths. For people with certain variants of the FER gene, the risk of death is reduced in sepsis caused by pneumonia. However, for those with TLR6 variants, the risk of getting Legionnaires' disease is increased.

=== Bacteria ===
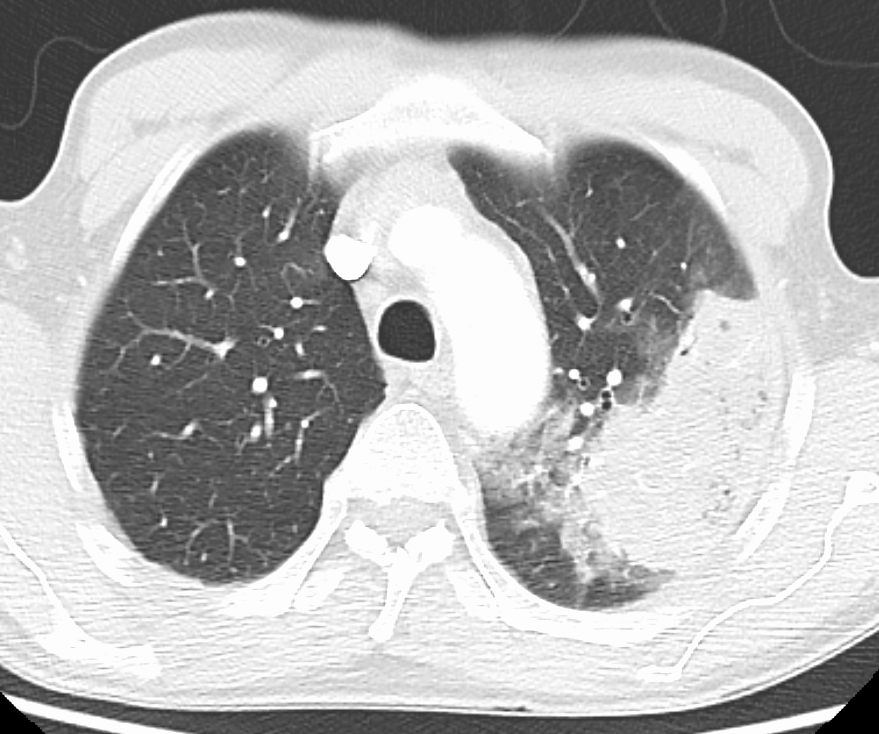
Cavitating pneumonia due to MRSA as seen on a CT scan

Bacteria are the most common cause of community-acquired pneumonia (CAP), with Streptococcus pneumoniae isolated in nearly 50% of cases. Other commonly isolated bacteria include Haemophilus influenzae in 20%, Chlamydophila pneumoniae in 13%, and Mycoplasma pneumoniae in 3% of cases; Staphylococcus aureus; Moraxella catarrhalis; and Legionella pneumophila. A number of drug-resistant versions of the above infections are becoming more common, including drug-resistant Streptococcus pneumoniae (DRSP) and methicillin-resistant Staphylococcus aureus (MRSA).

The spreading of organisms is facilitated by certain risk factors. Alcoholism is associated with Streptococcus pneumoniae, anaerobic organisms, and Mycobacterium tuberculosis; smoking facilitates the effects of Streptococcus pneumoniae, Haemophilus influenzae, Moraxella catarrhalis, and Legionella pneumophila. Exposure to birds is associated with Chlamydia psittaci; farm animals with Coxiella burnetti; aspiration of stomach contents with anaerobic organisms; and cystic fibrosis with Pseudomonas aeruginosa and Staphylococcus aureus. Streptococcus pneumoniae is more common in the winter, and it should be suspected in persons aspirating a large number of anaerobic organisms.

Pneumonia risk factors

Deaths from pneumonia in people aged 70 and older by risk factor

=== Viruses ===
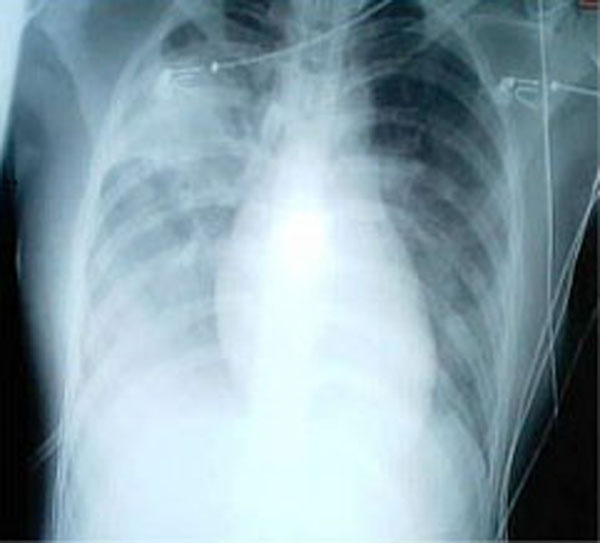
A chest x-ray of a patient with severe viral pneumonia due to SARS

In adults, viruses account for about one third of pneumonia cases, and in children for about 15% of them. Commonly implicated agents include rhinoviruses, coronaviruses, influenza virus, respiratory syncytial virus (RSV), adenovirus, and parainfluenza. Herpes simplex virus rarely causes pneumonia, except in groups such as newborns, persons with cancer, transplant recipients, and people with significant burns. After organ transplantation or in otherwise immunocompromised persons, there are high rates of cytomegalovirus pneumonia. Those with viral infections may be secondarily infected with the bacteria Streptococcus pneumoniae, Staphylococcus aureus, or Haemophilus influenzae, particularly when other health problems are present. Different viruses predominate at different times of the year; during flu season, for example, influenza may account for more than half of all viral cases. Outbreaks of other viruses also occur occasionally, including hantaviruses and coronaviruses. Severe acute respiratory syndrome coronavirus 2 (SARS-CoV-2) can also result in pneumonia.

=== Fungi ===
Fungal pneumonia is uncommon, but occurs more commonly in individuals with weakened immune systems due to AIDS, immunosuppressive drugs, or other medical problems. It is most often caused by Histoplasma capsulatum, Blastomyces, Cryptococcus neoformans, Pneumocystis jiroveci (pneumocystis pneumonia, or PCP), and Coccidioides immitis. Histoplasmosis is most common in the Mississippi River basin, and coccidioidomycosis is most common in the Southwestern United States. The number of cases of fungal pneumonia increased in the latter half of the 20th century due to increasing travel and rates of immunosuppression in the population. For people infected with HIV/AIDS, PCP is a common opportunistic infection.

=== Parasites ===
A variety of parasites can affect the lungs, including Toxoplasma gondii, Strongyloides stercoralis, Ascaris lumbricoides, and Plasmodium malariae. These organisms typically enter the body through direct contact with the skin, ingestion, or via an insect vector. Except for Paragonimus westermani, most parasites do not specifically affect the lungs but involve the lungs secondarily to other sites. Some parasites, in particular those belonging to the Ascaris and Strongyloides genera, stimulate a strong eosinophilic reaction, which may result in eosinophilic pneumonia. In other infections, such as malaria, lung involvement is due primarily to cytokine-induced systemic inflammation. In the developed world, these infections are most common in people returning from travel or in immigrants. Around the world, parasitic pneumonia is most common in the immunodeficient.

=== Noninfectious ===
Idiopathic interstitial pneumonia or noninfectious pneumonia is a class of diffuse lung diseases. They include diffuse alveolar damage, organizing pneumonia, nonspecific interstitial pneumonia, lymphocytic interstitial pneumonia, desquamative interstitial pneumonia, respiratory bronchiolitis interstitial lung disease, and usual interstitial pneumonia. Lipoid pneumonia is another rare cause due to lipids entering the lung. These lipids can either be inhaled or spread to the lungs from elsewhere in the body.

== Mechanisms ==
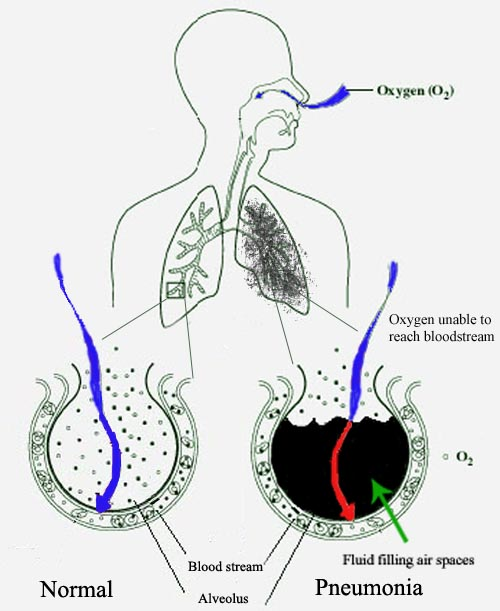
Pneumonia fills the lung's alveoli with fluid, hindering oxygenation. The alveolus on the left is normal, whereas the one on the right is full of fluid from pneumonia.

Pneumonia frequently starts as an upper respiratory tract infection that moves into the lower respiratory tract. It is a type of pneumonitis (lung inflammation). The normal flora of the upper airway give protection by competing with pathogens for nutrients. In the lower airways, reflexes of the glottis, actions of complement proteins and immunoglobulins are important for protection. Microaspiration of contaminated secretions can infect the lower airways and cause pneumonia. The progress of pneumonia is determined by the virulence of the organism; the amount of organism required to start an infection; and the body's immune response against the infection. The immunological responses in pneumonia are varied, with similar clinical presentations being underpinned by distinct immune phenotypes. The immune phenotypes in pneumonia are influenced by factors such as the causative pathogen, the patient's own immune status and their genetic background. In its most severe form pneumonia leads to acute respiratory distress syndrome.

=== Bacterial ===
Most bacteria enter the lungs via small aspirations of organisms residing in the throat or nose. Half of normal people have these small aspirations during sleep. While the throat always contains bacteria, potentially infectious ones reside there only at certain times and under certain conditions. A minority of types of bacteria such as Mycobacterium tuberculosis and Legionella pneumophila reach the lungs via contaminated airborne droplets. Bacteria can also spread via the blood. Once in the lungs, bacteria may invade the spaces between cells and between alveoli, where the macrophages and neutrophils (defensive white blood cells) attempt to inactivate the bacteria. The neutrophils also release cytokines, causing a general activation of the immune system. This leads to the fever, chills, and fatigue common in bacterial pneumonia. The neutrophils, bacteria, and fluid from surrounding blood vessels fill the alveoli, resulting in the consolidation seen on chest X-ray.

=== Viral ===
Viruses may reach the lung by a number of different routes. Respiratory syncytial virus is typically contracted when people touch contaminated objects and then touch their eyes or nose. Other viral infections occur when contaminated airborne droplets are inhaled through the nose or mouth. Once in the upper airway, the viruses may make their way into the lungs, where they invade the cells lining the airways, alveoli, or lung parenchyma. Some viruses such as measles and herpes simplex may reach the lungs via the blood. The invasion of the lungs may lead to varying degrees of cell death. When the immune system responds to the infection, even more lung damage may occur. Primarily white blood cells, mainly mononuclear cells, generate the inflammation. As well as damaging the lungs, many viruses simultaneously affect other organs and thus disrupt other body functions. Viruses also make the body more susceptible to bacterial infections; in this way, bacterial pneumonia can occur at the same time as viral pneumonia.

== Diagnosis ==
Crackles
Crackles heard in the lungs of a person with pneumonia using a stethoscope.

Pneumonia is typically diagnosed based on a combination of physical signs and often a chest X-ray. In adults with normal vital signs and a normal lung examination, the diagnosis is unlikely. However, the underlying cause can be difficult to confirm, as there is no definitive test able to distinguish between bacterial and non-bacterial cause. The overall impression of a physician appears to be at least as good as decision rules for making or excluding the diagnosis.

=== Children ===
Pneumonia careseeking

The World Health Organization has defined pneumonia in children clinically based on either a cough or difficulty breathing and a rapid respiratory rate, chest indrawing, or a decreased level of consciousness. A rapid respiratory rate is defined as greater than 60 breaths per minute in children under 2 months old, greater than 50 breaths per minute in children 2 months to 1 year old, or greater than 40 breaths per minute in children 1 to 5 years old.

In children, low oxygen levels and lower chest indrawing are more sensitive than hearing chest crackles with a stethoscope or increased respiratory rate. Grunting and nasal flaring may be other useful signs in children less than five years old.

Lack of wheezing is an indicator of Mycoplasma pneumoniae in children with pneumonia, but as an indicator it is not accurate enough to decide whether or not macrolide treatment should be used. The presence of chest pain in children with pneumonia doubles the probability of Mycoplasma pneumoniae.

=== Adults ===
In general, in adults, investigations are not needed in mild cases. There is a very low risk of pneumonia if all vital signs and auscultation are normal. C-reactive protein (CRP) may help support the diagnosis. For those with CRP less than 20 mg/L without convincing evidence of pneumonia, antibiotics are not recommended.

Procalcitonin may help determine the cause and support decisions about who should receive antibiotics. Antibiotics are encouraged if the procalcitonin level reaches 0.25 μg/L, strongly encouraged if it reaches 0.5 μg/L, and strongly discouraged if the level is below 0.10 μg/L. In people requiring hospitalization, pulse oximetry, chest radiography and blood tests – including a complete blood count, serum electrolytes, C-reactive protein level, and possibly liver function tests – are recommended.

The diagnosis of influenza-like illness can be made based on the signs and symptoms; however, confirmation of an influenza infection requires testing. Thus, treatment is frequently based on the presence of influenza in the community or a rapid influenza test.

Adults 65 years old or older, as well as cigarette smokers and people with ongoing medical conditions are at increased risk for pneumonia.

=== Physical exam ===
Physical examination may sometimes reveal low blood pressure, high heart rate, or low oxygen saturation. The respiratory rate may be faster than normal, and this may occur a day or two before other signs. Examination of the chest may be normal, but it may show decreased expansion on the affected side. Harsh breath sounds from the larger airways that are transmitted through the inflamed lung are termed bronchial breathing and are heard on auscultation with a stethoscope. Crackles (rales) may be heard over the affected area during inspiration. Percussion may be dulled over the affected lung, and increased, rather than decreased, vocal resonance distinguishes pneumonia from a pleural effusion.

=== Imaging ===
A chest X-ray showing a very prominent wedge-shaped area of airspace consolidation in the right lung characteristic of acute bacterial lobar pneumonia

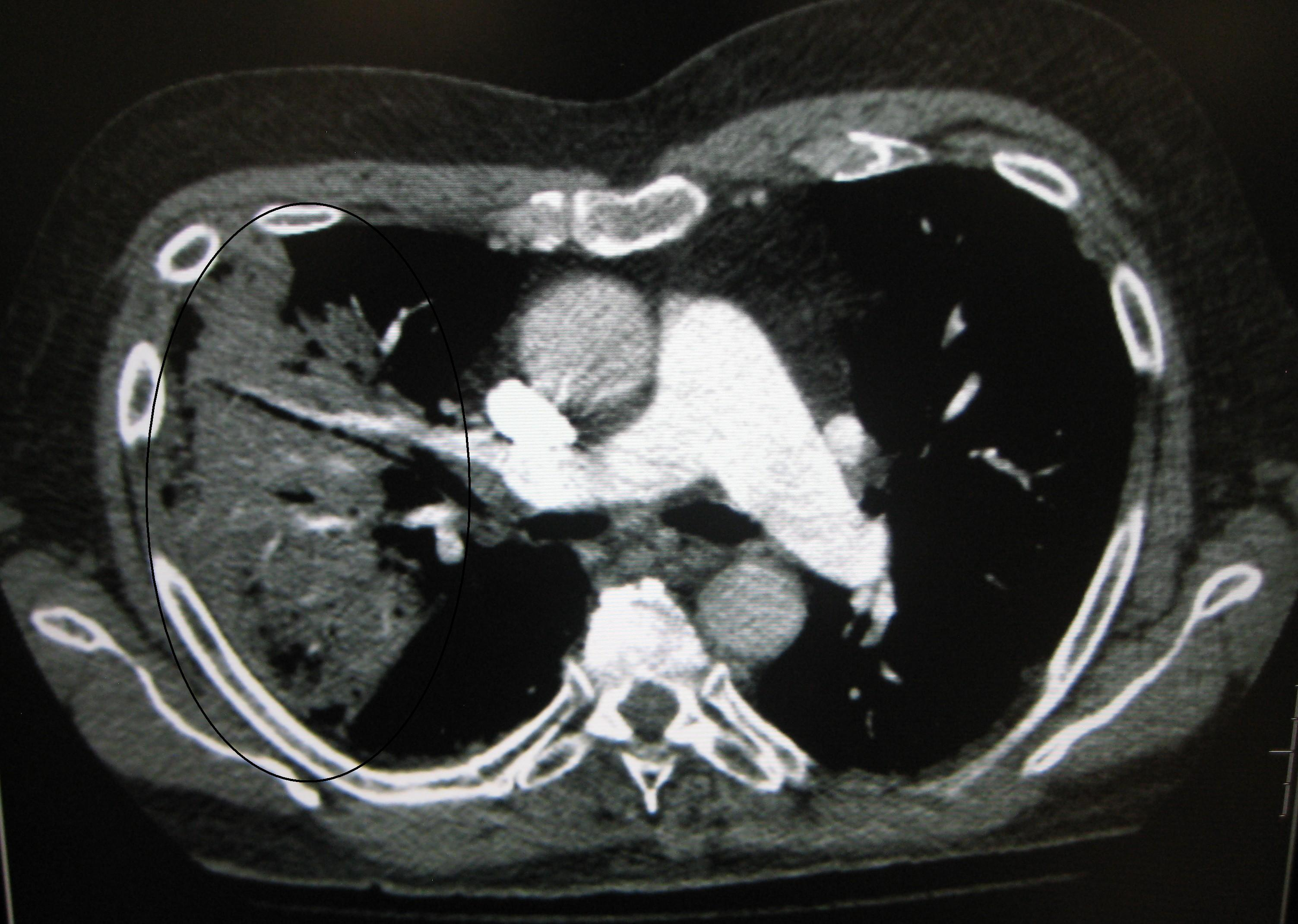
CT of the chest demonstrating right-sided pneumonia (left side of the image)

A chest radiograph is frequently used in diagnosis. In people with mild disease, imaging is needed only in those with potential complications, those not having improved with treatment, or those in which the cause is uncertain. If a person is sufficiently sick to require hospitalization, a chest radiograph is recommended. Findings do not always match the severity of disease and do not reliably separate between bacterial and viral infection.

X-ray presentations of pneumonia may be classified as lobar pneumonia, bronchopneumonia, lobular pneumonia, and interstitial pneumonia. Bacterial, community-acquired pneumonia classically show lung consolidation of one lung segmental lobe, which is known as lobar pneumonia. However, findings may vary, and other patterns are common in other types of pneumonia. Aspiration pneumonia may present with bilateral opacities primarily in the bases of the lungs and on the right side. Radiographs of viral pneumonia may appear normal, appear hyper-inflated, have bilateral patchy areas, or present similar to bacterial pneumonia with lobar consolidation. Radiologic findings may not be present in the early stages of the disease, especially in the presence of dehydration, or may be difficult to interpret in the obese or those with a history of lung disease. Complications such as pleural effusion may also be found on chest radiographs. Laterolateral chest radiographs can increase the diagnostic accuracy of lung consolidation and pleural effusion.

A CT scan can give additional information in indeterminate cases and provide more details in those with an unclear chest radiograph (for example occult pneumonia in chronic obstructive pulmonary disease). They can be used to exclude pulmonary embolism and fungal pneumonia, and detect lung abscesses in those who are not responding to treatments. However, CT scans are more expensive, have a higher dose of radiation, and cannot be done at bedside.

Lung ultrasound may also be useful in helping to make the diagnosis. Ultrasound is radiation free and can be done at bedside. However, ultrasound requires specific skills to operate the machine and interpret the findings. It may be more accurate than chest X-ray.

Pneumonia seen by ultrasound

Pneumonia seen by ultrasound

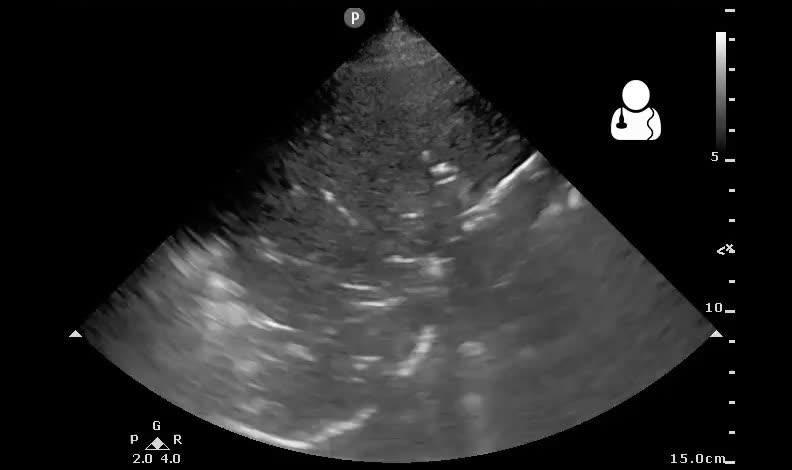
Pneumonia seen by ultrasound

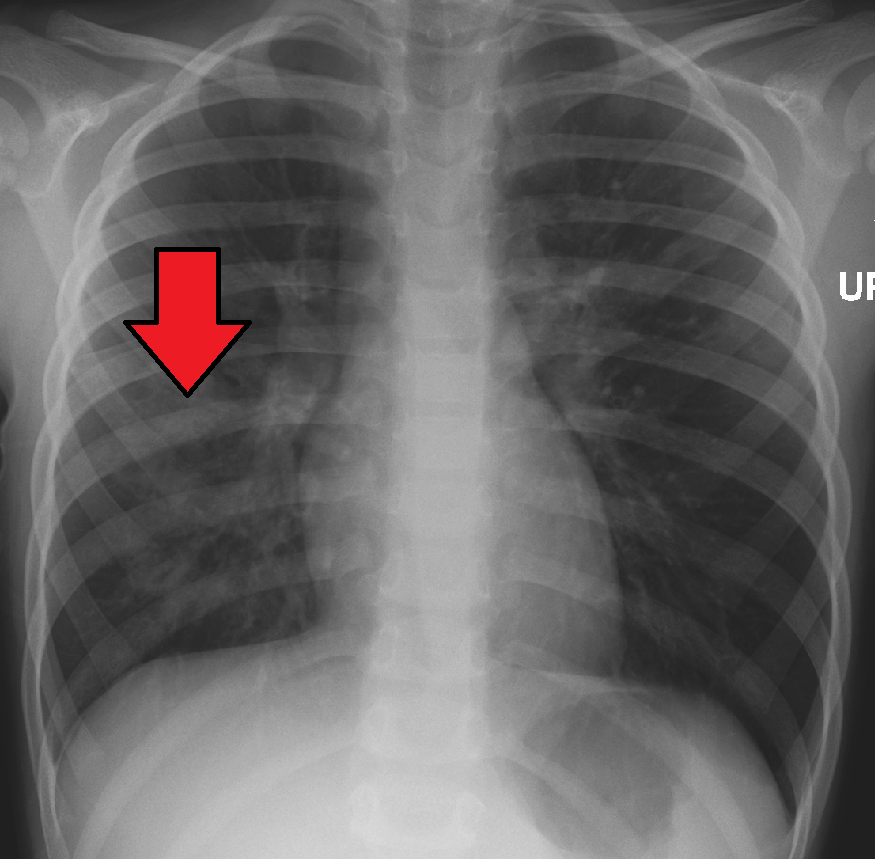
Right middle lobe pneumonia in a child as seen on plain X-ray

=== Microbiology ===
In people managed in the community, determining the causative agent is not cost-effective and typically does not alter management. For people who do not respond to treatment, sputum culture should be considered, and culture for Mycobacterium tuberculosis should be carried out in persons with a chronic productive cough. Microbiological evaluation is also indicated in severe pneumonia, alcoholism, asplenia, immunosuppression, HIV infection, and those being empirically treated for MRSA or Pseudomonas. Although positive blood culture and pleural fluid culture definitively establish the diagnosis of the type of micro-organism involved, a positive sputum culture has to be interpreted with care for the possibility of colonisation of respiratory tract. Testing for other specific organisms may be recommended during outbreaks, for public health reasons. In those hospitalized for severe disease, both sputum and blood cultures are recommended, as well as testing the urine for antigens to Legionella and Streptococcus. Viral infections, can be confirmed via detection of either the virus or its antigens with culture or polymerase chain reaction (PCR), among other techniques. Mycoplasma, Legionella, Streptococcus, and Chlamydia can also be detected using PCR techniques on bronchoalveolar lavage and nasopharyngeal swab. The causative agent is determined in only 15% of cases with routine microbiological tests.

=== Classification ===
Pneumonitis refers to lung inflammation; pneumonia refers to pneumonitis, usually due to infection but sometimes non-infectious, that has the additional feature of pulmonary consolidation. Pneumonia is most commonly classified by where or how it was acquired: community-acquired, aspiration, healthcare-associated, hospital-acquired, and ventilator-associated pneumonia. It may also be classified by the area of the lung affected: lobar, bronchial pneumonia and acute interstitial pneumonia; or by the causative organism. Pneumonia in children may additionally be classified based on signs and symptoms as non-severe, severe, or very severe.

The setting in which pneumonia develops is important to treatment, as it correlates to which pathogens are likely suspects, which mechanisms are likely, which antibiotics are likely to work or fail, and which complications can be expected based on the person's health status.

==== Community ====
Community-acquired pneumonia (CAP) is acquired in the community, outside of health care facilities. Compared with healthcare-associated pneumonia, it is less likely to involve multidrug-resistant bacteria. Although the latter are no longer rare in CAP, they are still less likely. Prior stays in healthcare-related environments such as hospitals, nursing homes, or hemodialysis centers or a history of receiving domiciliary care can increase patients' risk for CAP caused by multidrug-resistant bacteria.

==== Healthcare ====
Health care–associated pneumonia (HCAP) is an infection associated with recent exposure to the health care system, including hospitals, outpatient clinics, nursing homes, dialysis centers, chemotherapy treatment, or home care. HCAP is sometimes called MCAP (medical care–associated pneumonia).

People may become infected with pneumonia in a hospital; this is defined as pneumonia not present at the time of admission (symptoms must start at least 48 hours after admission). It is likely to involve hospital-acquired infections, with higher risk of multidrug-resistant pathogens. People in a hospital often have other medical conditions, which may make them more susceptible to pathogens in the hospital.

Ventilator-associated pneumonia occurs in people breathing with the help of mechanical ventilation. Ventilator-associated pneumonia is specifically defined as pneumonia that arises more than 48 to 72 hours after endotracheal intubation.

=== Differential diagnosis ===
Several diseases can present with similar signs and symptoms to pneumonia, such as: chronic obstructive pulmonary disease, asthma, pulmonary edema, bronchiectasis, lung cancer, and pulmonary emboli. Unlike pneumonia, asthma and COPD typically present with wheezing, pulmonary edema presents with an abnormal electrocardiogram, cancer and bronchiectasis present with a cough of longer duration, and pulmonary emboli present with acute onset sharp chest pain and shortness of breath. Mild pneumonia should be differentiated from upper respiratory tract infection (URTI). Severe pneumonia should be differentiated from acute heart failure. Pulmonary infiltrates that resolved after giving mechanical ventilation should point to heart failure and atelectasis rather than pneumonia. For recurrent pneumonia, underlying lung cancer, metastasis, tuberculosis, foreign bodies, immunosuppression, and hypersensitivity should be suspected.

== Prevention ==
Prevention includes vaccination, environmental measures, and appropriate treatment of other health problems. It is believed that, if appropriate preventive measures were instituted globally, mortality among children could be reduced by 400,000; and, if proper treatment were universally available, childhood deaths could be decreased by another 600,000.

=== Vaccination ===
Share of one year olds who received the final dose of pneumococcal vaccine

Vaccination protects against certain bacterial and viral pneumonias in both children and adults. Influenza vaccines are modestly effective at preventing symptoms of influenza, The Centers for Disease Control and Prevention (CDC) recommends yearly influenza vaccination for every person 6 months and older. Immunizing health care workers decreases the risk of viral pneumonia among their patients.

Vaccinations against Haemophilus influenzae and Streptococcus pneumoniae have good evidence to support their use. There is strong evidence for vaccinating children under the age of 2 against Streptococcus pneumoniae (pneumococcal conjugate vaccine). Vaccinating children against Streptococcus pneumoniae has led to a decreased rate of these infections in adults, because many adults acquire infections from children. A Streptococcus pneumoniae vaccine is available for adults, and has been found to decrease the risk of invasive pneumococcal disease by 74%, but there is insufficient evidence to suggest using the pneumococcal vaccine to prevent pneumonia or death in the general adult population. The CDC recommends that young children and adults aged 50 or older receive the pneumococcal vaccine, as well as older children or younger adults who have an increased risk of getting pneumococcal disease. In October 2024, the CDC lowered the age for adult pneumococcal vaccination from 65 to 50 years old to give more adults the opportunity to protect themselves from pneumococcal disease at the age when risk of infection substantially increases. The pneumococcal vaccine has been shown to reduce the risk of community acquired pneumonia in people with chronic obstructive pulmonary disease, but does not reduce mortality or the risk of hospitalization for people with this condition. People with COPD are recommended by a number of guidelines to have a pneumococcal vaccination. Other vaccines for which there is support for a protective effect against pneumonia include pertussis, varicella, and measles.

=== Medications ===
When influenza outbreaks occur, medications such as baloxavir (Xofluza) or oseltamivir (Tamiflu) may help prevent the condition. Oseltamivir has been used for up to 16 weeks in influenza prophylaxis. Zanamivir or oseltamivir decrease the chance that people who are exposed to the virus will develop symptoms; however, it is recommended that potential side effects are taken into account.

=== Other ===
Smoking cessation and reducing indoor air pollution, such as that from cooking indoors with wood, crop residues or dung, are both recommended. Smoking appears to be the single biggest risk factor for pneumococcal pneumonia in otherwise-healthy adults. Hand hygiene and coughing into one's sleeve may also be effective preventative measures. Wearing surgical masks by the sick may also prevent illness.

Appropriately treating underlying illnesses (such as HIV/AIDS, diabetes mellitus, and malnutrition) can decrease the risk of pneumonia. In children less than 6 months of age, exclusive breast feeding reduces both the risk and severity of disease. In people with HIV/AIDS and a CD4 count of less than 200 cells/uL the antibiotic trimethoprim/sulfamethoxazole decreases the risk of Pneumocystis pneumonia and is also useful for prevention in those that are immunocompromised but do not have HIV.

Testing pregnant women for Group B Streptococcus and Chlamydia trachomatis, and administering antibiotic treatment, if needed, reduces rates of pneumonia in infants; preventive measures for HIV transmission from mother to child may also be efficient. Suctioning the mouth and throat of infants with meconium-stained amniotic fluid has not been found to reduce the rate of aspiration pneumonia and may cause potential harm, thus this practice is not recommended in the majority of situations. In the frail elderly good oral health care may lower the risk of aspiration pneumonia, even though there is no good evidence that one approach to mouth care is better than others in preventing nursing home acquired pneumonia. Zinc supplementation in children 2 months to five years old appears to reduce rates of pneumonia.

For people with low levels of vitamin C in their diet or blood, taking vitamin C supplements may be suggested to decrease the risk of pneumonia, although there is no strong evidence of benefit. There is insufficient evidence to recommend that the general population take vitamin C to prevent or treat pneumonia.

For adults and children in the hospital who require a respirator, there is no strong evidence indicating a difference between heat and moisture exchangers and heated humidifiers for preventing pneumonia. There is tentative evidence that lying flat on the back compared to semi-raised increases pneumonia risks in people who are intubated.

== Management ==
CURB-65
Symptom	Points
Confusion	1
Urea>7 mmol/L	1
Respiratory rate>30	1
SBP<90mmHg, DBP<60mmHg	1
Age>=65	1

Antibiotics by mouth, rest, simple analgesics, and fluids usually suffice for complete resolution. Antibiotic therapy for children aged 2 to 59 months with non-severe pneumonia and wheeze may reduce treatment failure by 20%; however, it results in little or no difference in clinical cure or relapse, and may increase treatment-related harms. However, those with other medical conditions, the elderly, or those with significant trouble breathing may require more advanced care. If the symptoms worsen, the pneumonia does not improve with home treatment, or complications occur, hospitalization may be required. Worldwide, approximately 7–13% of cases in children result in hospitalization, whereas in the developed world between 22 and 42% of adults with community-acquired pneumonia are admitted. The CURB-65 score is useful for determining the need for admission in adults. If the score is 0 or 1, people can typically be managed at home; if it is 2, a short hospital stay or close follow-up is needed; if it is 3–5, hospitalization is recommended. In children those with respiratory distress or oxygen saturations of less than 90% should be hospitalized. The utility of chest physiotherapy in pneumonia has not yet been determined. Over-the-counter cough medicine has not been found to be effective, nor has the use of zinc supplementation in children. There is insufficient evidence for mucolytics. There is no strong evidence to recommend that children who have non-measles related pneumonia take vitamin A supplements. Vitamin D, as of 2023, is of unclear benefit in children. The role of vitamin C in pneumonia needs further research; some trials have found lower mortality and reduced severity among critically ill patients, and supplementation may reasonably be offered to patients with low plasma vitamin C levels, given its low cost and minimal risk.

Pneumonia can cause severe illness in a number of ways, and pneumonia with evidence of organ dysfunction may require intensive care unit admission for observation and specific treatment. The main impact is on the respiratory and the circulatory system. Respiratory failure not responding to normal oxygen therapy may require heated humidified high-flow therapy delivered through nasal cannulae, non-invasive ventilation, or in severe cases mechanical ventilation through an endotracheal tube. Regarding circulatory problems as part of sepsis, evidence of poor blood flow or low blood pressure is initially treated with 30 mL/kg of crystalloid infused intravenously. In situations where fluids alone are ineffective, vasopressor medication may be required.

For adults with moderate or severe acute respiratory distress syndrome (ARDS) undergoing mechanical ventilation, there is a reduction in mortality when people lie on their front for at least 12 hours a day. However, this increases the risk of endotracheal tube obstruction and pressure sores.

=== Bacterial ===
Antibiotics improve outcomes in those with bacterial pneumonia. The first dose of antibiotics should be given as soon as possible. Increased use of antibiotics, however, may lead to the development of antimicrobial resistant strains of bacteria. Antibiotic choice depends initially on the characteristics of the person affected, such as age, underlying health, and the location the infection was acquired. Antibiotic use is also associated with side effects such as nausea, diarrhea, dizziness, taste distortion, or headaches. In the UK, treatment before culture results with amoxicillin is recommended as the first line for community-acquired pneumonia, with doxycycline or clarithromycin as alternatives. In North America, amoxicillin, doxycycline, and in some areas a macrolide (such as azithromycin or erythromycin) is the first-line outpatient treatment in adults. In children with mild or moderate symptoms, amoxicillin taken by mouth is the first line. The use of fluoroquinolones in uncomplicated cases is discouraged due to concerns about side-effects and generating resistance in light of there being no greater benefit.

For those who require hospitalization and caught their pneumonia in the community the use of a β-lactam such as ceftriaxone plus a macrolide such as azithromycin is recommended. A fluoroquinolone may replace azithromycin but is less preferred. Antibiotics by mouth and by injection appear to be similarly effective in children with severe pneumonia.

The duration of treatment has traditionally been seven to ten days, but increasing evidence suggests that shorter courses (3–5 days) may be effective for certain types of pneumonia and may reduce the risk of antibiotic resistance. Research in children showed that a shorter, 3-day course of amoxicillin was as effective as a longer, 7-day course for treating pneumonia in this population. For pneumonia that is associated with a ventilator caused by non-fermenting Gram-negative bacilli (NF-GNB), a shorter course of antibiotics increases the risk that the pneumonia will return. Recommendations for hospital-acquired pneumonia include third- and fourth-generation cephalosporins, carbapenems, fluoroquinolones, aminoglycosides, and vancomycin. These antibiotics are often given intravenously and used in combination. In those treated in hospital, more than 90% improve with the initial antibiotics. For people with ventilator-acquired pneumonia, the choice of antibiotic therapy will depend on the person's risk of being infected with a strain of bacteria that is multi-drug resistant. Once clinically stable, intravenous antibiotics should be switched to oral antibiotics. For those with Methicillin resistant Staphylococcus aureus (MRSA) or Legionella infections, prolonged antibiotics may be beneficial.

The addition of corticosteroids to standard antibiotic treatment appears to improve outcomes, reducing death and morbidity for adults with severe community acquired pneumonia, and reducing death for adults and children with non-severe community acquired pneumonia. Following several randomised trials, including the CAPE-COD study , ESCAPe and REMAP-CAP steroid arm a meta-analysis was conducted which found evidence of benefit of corticosteroids in severe community-acquired pneumonia. This has led to updated guidelines recommending corticosteroids, but only in high severity pneumonia. This differs from older recommendations which were issued before the most recent studies. Side effects associated with the use of corticosteroids include high blood sugar. The heterogeneity of treatment responses to corticosteroids may relate to differences in underlying immune phenotypes, with some work suggesting that these medications are only of benefit in patients with hyperinflammatory phenotypes. There is some evidence that adding corticosteroids to the standard PCP pneumonia treatment may be beneficial for people who are infected with HIV. Corticosteroids are not currently recommended in hospital-acquired pneumonia due to a lack of evidence in this area.

The use of granulocyte colony stimulating factor (G-CSF) along with antibiotics does not appear to reduce mortality and routine use for treating pneumonia is not supported by evidence.

=== Viral ===
Neuraminidase inhibitors may be used to treat viral pneumonia caused by influenza viruses (influenza A and influenza B). No specific antiviral medications are recommended for other types of community acquired viral pneumonias including SARS coronavirus, adenovirus, hantavirus, and parainfluenza virus. Influenza A or B may be treated with baloxavir, oseltamivir, zanamivir or peramivir. These are of most benefit if they are started within 48 hours of the onset of symptoms. Many strains of H5N1 influenza A, also known as avian influenza or "bird flu", have shown resistance to rimantadine and amantadine. The use of antibiotics in viral pneumonia is recommended by some experts, as it is impossible to rule out a complicating bacterial infection. The British Thoracic Society recommends that antibiotics be withheld in those with mild disease. The use of corticosteroids is controversial and is being examined in ongoing trials.

=== Aspiration ===
In general, aspiration pneumonitis is treated conservatively with antibiotics indicated only for aspiration pneumonia. The choice of antibiotic will depend on several factors, including the suspected causative organism and whether pneumonia was acquired in the community or developed in a hospital setting. Common options include clindamycin, a combination of a beta-lactam antibiotic and metronidazole, or an aminoglycoside. Corticosteroids are sometimes used in aspiration pneumonia, but there is limited evidence to support their effectiveness.

=== Follow-up ===
The British Thoracic Society recommends that a follow-up chest radiograph be taken in people with persistent symptoms, smokers, and people older than 50. American guidelines vary, from generally recommending a follow-up chest radiograph to not mentioning any follow-up.

== Prognosis ==
Pneumonia mortality by age

With treatment, most types of bacterial pneumonia will stabilize in 3–6 days. It often takes a few weeks before most symptoms resolve. X-ray findings typically clear within four weeks and mortality is low (less than 1%). In the elderly or people with other lung problems, recovery may take more than 12 weeks. In persons requiring hospitalization, mortality may be as high as 10%, and in those requiring intensive care it may reach 30–50%. Pneumonia is the most common hospital-acquired infection that causes death. Before the advent of antibiotics, mortality was typically 30% in those that were hospitalized. However, for those whose lung condition deteriorates within 72 hours, the problem is usually due to sepsis. If pneumonia deteriorates after 72 hours, it could be due to nosocomial infection or exacerbation of other underlying comorbidities. About 10% of those discharged from hospital are readmitted due to underlying co-morbidities such as heart, lung, or neurological disorders, or due to new onset of pneumonia.

Complications may occur in particular in the elderly and those with underlying health problems. This may include, among others: empyema, lung abscess, bronchiolitis obliterans, acute respiratory distress syndrome, sepsis, and worsening of underlying health problems.

=== Clinical prediction rules ===
Clinical prediction rules have been developed to more objectively predict outcomes of pneumonia. These rules are often used to decide whether to hospitalize the person.

- CURB-65 score, which takes into account the severity of symptoms, any underlying diseases, and age
- Pneumonia severity index (or PSI Score)

=== Pleural effusion, empyema, and abscess ===
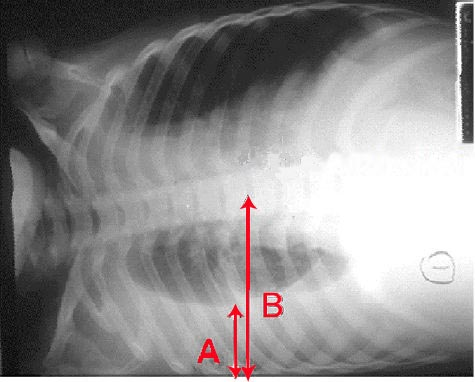
A pleural effusion: as seen on chest X-ray. The A arrow indicates fluid layering in the right chest. The B arrow indicates the width of the right lung. The volume of the lung is reduced because of the collection of fluid around the lung.

In pneumonia, a collection of fluid may form in the space that surrounds the lung. Occasionally, microorganisms will infect this fluid, causing an empyema. To distinguish an empyema from the more common simple parapneumonic effusion, the fluid may be collected with a needle (thoracentesis), and examined. If this shows evidence of empyema, complete drainage of the fluid is necessary, often requiring a drainage catheter. In severe cases of empyema, surgery may be needed. If the infected fluid is not drained, the infection may persist, because antibiotics do not penetrate well into the pleural cavity. If the fluid is sterile, it must be drained only if it is causing symptoms or remains unresolved.

In rare circumstances, bacteria in the lung will form a pocket of infected fluid called a lung abscess. Lung abscesses can usually be seen with a chest X-ray but frequently require a chest CT scan to confirm the diagnosis. Abscesses typically occur in aspiration pneumonia, and often contain several types of bacteria. Long-term antibiotics are usually adequate to treat a lung abscess, but sometimes the abscess must be drained by a surgeon or radiologist.

=== Respiratory and circulatory failure ===
Pneumonia can cause respiratory failure by triggering acute respiratory distress syndrome (ARDS), which results from a combination of infection and inflammatory response. The lungs quickly fill with fluid and become stiff. This stiffness, combined with severe difficulties extracting oxygen due to the alveolar fluid, may require long periods of mechanical ventilation for survival. Other causes of circulatory failure are hypoxemia, inflammation, and increased coagulability.

Sepsis is a potential complication of pneumonia but usually occurs in people with poor immunity or hyposplenism. The organisms most commonly involved are Streptococcus pneumoniae, Haemophilus influenzae, and Klebsiella pneumoniae. Other causes of the symptoms should be considered such as a myocardial infarction or a pulmonary embolism.

== Epidemiology ==
Pneumonia is a common illness affecting approximately 450 million people a year and occurring in all parts of the world. It is a major cause of death among all age groups resulting in 4 million deaths (7% of the world's total death) yearly. Rates are greatest in children less than five, and adults older than 75 years. It occurs about five times more frequently in the developing world than in the developed world. Viral pneumonia accounts for about 200 million cases. In the United States, as of 2009, pneumonia is the 8th leading cause of death.

=== Children ===
In 2008, pneumonia occurred in approximately 156 million children (151 million in the developing world and 5 million in the developed world). In 2010, it resulted in 1.3 million deaths, or 18% of all deaths in those under five years, of which 95% occurred in the developing world. Countries with the greatest burden of disease include India (43 million), China (21 million) and Pakistan (10 million). It is the leading cause of death among children in low income countries. Many of these deaths occur in the newborn period. The World Health Organization estimates that one in three newborn infant deaths is due to pneumonia. Approximately half of these deaths can be prevented, as they are caused by the bacteria for which an effective vaccine is available. The IDSA has recommended that children and infants with symptoms of CAP should be hospitalized so they have access to pediatric nursing care. In 2011, pneumonia was the most common reason for admission to the hospital after an emergency department visit in the U.S. for infants and children.

Pneumonia death rates age standardized

Pneumonia death rates in children under 5

== History ==
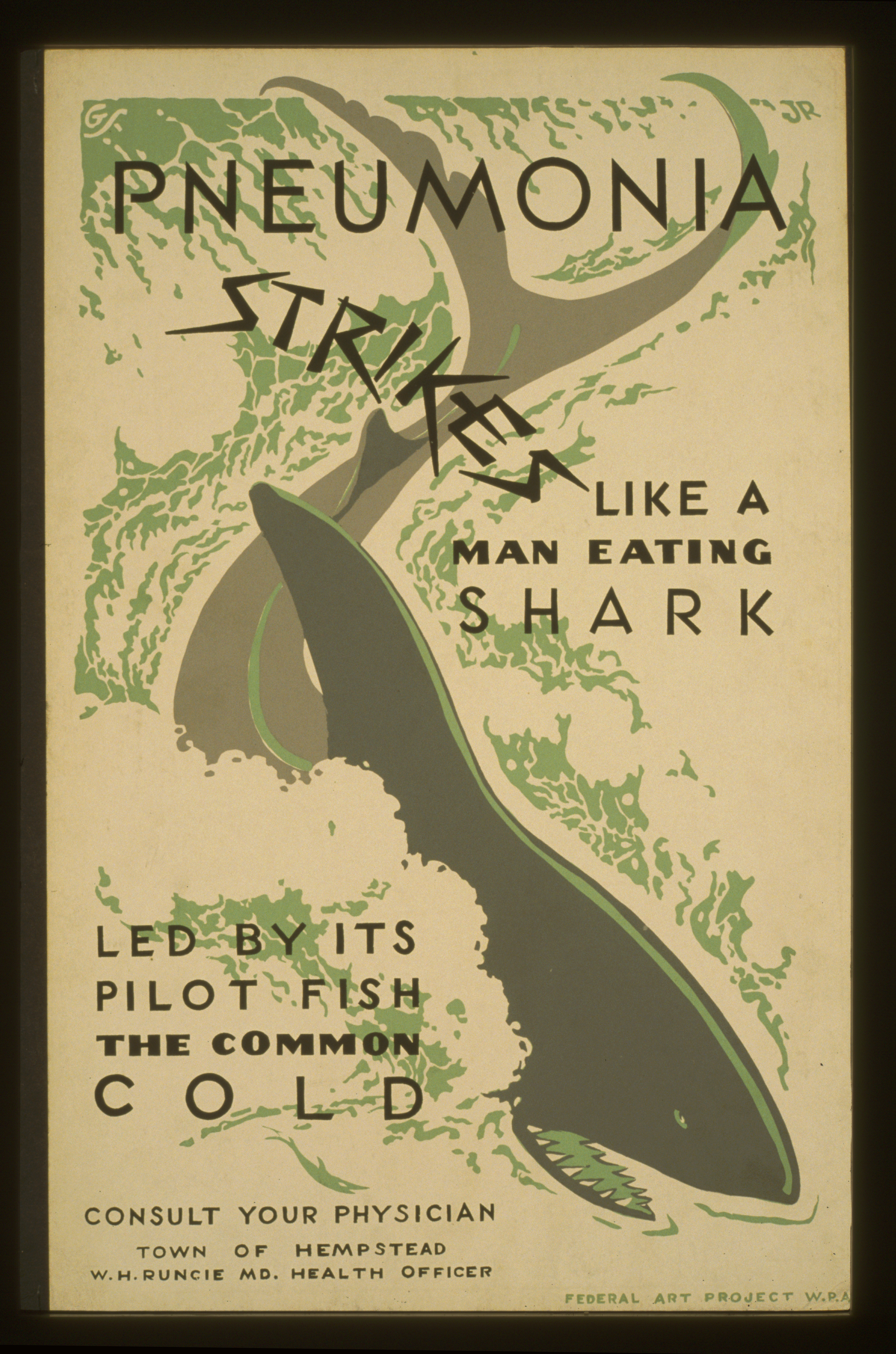
WPA poster, 1936/1937

Pneumonia has been a common disease throughout human history. The word is from Greek πνεύμων (pneúmōn) meaning "lung". The symptoms were described by Hippocrates (c. 460–370 BC): "Peripneumonia, and pleuritic affections, are to be thus observed: If the fever be acute, and if there be pains on either side, or in both, and if expiration be if cough be present, and the sputa expectorated be of a blond or livid color, or likewise thin, frothy, and florid, or having any other character different from the common... When pneumonia is at its height, the case is beyond remedy if he is not purged, and it is bad if he has dyspnoea, and urine that is thin and acrid, and if sweats come out about the neck and head, for such sweats are bad, as proceeding from the suffocation, rales, and the violence of the disease which is obtaining the upper hand." However, Hippocrates referred to pneumonia as a disease "named by the ancients". He also reported the results of surgical drainage of empyemas. Maimonides (1135–1204 AD) observed: "The basic symptoms that occur in pneumonia and that are never lacking are as follows: acute fever, sticking pleuritic pain in the side, short rapid breaths, serrated pulse and cough." This clinical description is quite similar to those found in modern textbooks, and it reflected the extent of medical knowledge through the Middle Ages into the 19th century.

Edwin Klebs was the first to observe bacteria in the airways of persons having died of pneumonia in 1875. Initial work identifying the two common bacterial causes, Streptococcus pneumoniae and Klebsiella pneumoniae, was performed by Carl Friedländer and Albert Fraenkel in 1882 and 1884, respectively. Friedländer's initial work introduced the Gram stain, a fundamental laboratory test still used today to identify and categorize bacteria. Christian Gram's paper describing the procedure in 1884 helped to differentiate the two bacteria, and showed that pneumonia could be caused by more than one microorganism. In 1887, Jaccond demonstrated pneumonia may be caused by opportunistic bacteria always present in the lung.

Sir William Osler, known as "the father of modern medicine", appreciated the death and disability caused by pneumonia, describing it as the "captain of the men of death" in 1918, as it had overtaken tuberculosis as one of the leading causes of death at the time. This phrase was originally coined by John Bunyan in reference to "consumption" (tuberculosis). Osler also described pneumonia as "the old man's friend" as death was often quick and painless when there were much slower and more painful ways to die. That same year, a study found that pneumonia's mortality in infants reached 57.7% at the Babies' Hospital in New York City.

Viral pneumonia was first described by Hobart Reimann in 1938. Reimann, Chairman of the Department of Medicine at Jefferson Medical College, had established the practice of routinely typing the pneumococcal organism in cases where pneumonia presented. Out of this work, the distinction between viral and bacterial strains was noticed.

Several developments in the 1900s improved the outcome for those with pneumonia. With the advent of penicillin and other antibiotics, modern surgical techniques, and intensive care in the 20th century, mortality from pneumonia, which had approached 30%, dropped precipitously in the developed world. Vaccination of infants against Haemophilus influenzae type B began in 1988 and led to a dramatic decline in cases shortly thereafter. Vaccination against Streptococcus pneumoniae in adults began in 1977, and in children in 2000, resulting in a similar decline.

== Society and culture ==
=== Awareness ===
Due to the relatively low awareness of the disease, 12 November was declared in 2009 as the annual World Pneumonia Day, a day for concerned citizens and policy makers to take action against the disease.

=== Costs ===
The global economic cost of community-acquired pneumonia has been estimated at $17 billion annually. Other estimates are considerably higher. In 2012 the estimated aggregate costs of treating pneumonia in the United States were $20 billion; the median cost of a single pneumonia-related hospitalization is over $15,000. According to data released by the Centers for Medicare and Medicaid Services, average 2012 hospital charges for inpatient treatment of uncomplicated pneumonia in the U.S. were $24,549 and ranged as high as $124,000. The average cost of an emergency room consult for pneumonia was $943 and the average cost for medication was $66. Aggregate annual costs of treating pneumonia in Europe have been estimated at €10 billion.
