= CURB-65 =

Medical scoring system

CURB-65
| Symptom | Points |
|---|---|
| Confusion | 1 |
| BUN>7 mmol/L (19 mg/dL) | 1 |
| Respiratory rate≥30 | 1 |
| BP: S<90mmHg, D≤60mmHg | 1 |
| Age≥65 | 1 |

CURB-65, also known as the CURB criteria, is a clinical prediction rule that has been validated for predicting mortality in community-acquired pneumonia and infection of any site. The CURB-65 is based on the earlier CURB score and is recommended by the British Thoracic Society for the assessment of severity of pneumonia. It was developed in 2002 at the University of Nottingham by Dr. W.S. Lim et al. In 2018 a new toolkit was presented on the basis of CURB-65.

The score is an acronym for each of the risk factors measured. Each risk factor scores one point, for a maximum score of 5:

- Confusion of new onset (defined as an AMTS of 8 or less)
- Blood Urea nitrogen greater than 7 mmol/L (19 mg/dL)
- Respiratory rate of 30 breaths per minute or greater
- Blood pressure less than 90 mmHg systolic or diastolic blood pressure 60 mmHg or less
- Age 65 or older

== Predicting death ==
=== Pneumonia ===
The risk of death at 30 days increases as the score increases:

- 0—0.7%
- 1—3.2%
- 2—13.0%
- 3—17.0%
- 4—41.5%
- 5—57.0%

The CURB-65 has been compared to the pneumonia severity index in predicting mortality from pneumonia. It was shown that the PSI has a higher discriminatory power for short-term mortality, and thus is more accurate for low risk patients than the CURB-65 or its predecessor, the CURB score. However, the PSI is more complicated and requires arterial blood gas sampling amongst other tests; given this, the CURB-65 score is more easily used in primary care settings. A variant of the CURB-65 that omits the urea measurement (CRB-65) is even simpler, as it relies only on history and examination findings rather than blood tests.

The CURB-65 is used as a means of deciding the action that is needed to be taken for that patient.

- 0-1: Treat as an outpatient
- 2: Consider a short stay in hospital or watch very closely as an outpatient
- 3-5: Requires hospitalization with consideration as to whether they need to be in the intensive care unit

=== Any infection ===
Patients with any type of infection (half of the patients had pneumonia), the risk of death increases as the score increases:

- 0 to 1: <5% mortality
- 2 to 3: < 10% mortality
- 4 to 5: 15-30% mortality
