= NACA score =

- Synonyms: National Advisory Committee for Aeronautics score
- Purpose: scored severity of medical emergency

A NACA score (or National Advisory Committee for Aeronautics score) is a scoring system of the severity in cases of medical emergencies such as injuries, diseases or poisonings. It was developed from the National Advisory Committee for Aeronautics for accidents in aviation.

The NACA score is divided into the following, specified with Roman numerals or the Arabic zero.

Categories:

| Category | Description | Example |
|---|---|---|
| NACA 0 | No injury or disease. This category is often deleted or replaced by NACA I. | |
| NACA I | Minor disturbance. No medical intervention is required. | E.g. slight abrasion. |
| NACA II | Slight to moderate disturbance. Outpatient medical investigation, but usually no emergency medical measures necessary. | for example, fracture of a finger bone, moderate cuts, dehydration. |
| NACA III | Moderate to severe but not life-threatening disorder. Stationary treatment required, often emergency medical measures on the site | e.g. femur fracture, milder stroke, smoke inhalation. |
| NACA IV | Serious incident where rapid development into a life-threatening condition can not be excluded. In the majority of cases, emergency medical care is required | for example. vertebral injury with neurological deficit, severe asthma attack; drug poisoning. |
| NACA V | Acute danger | for example, third grade skull or brain trauma, severe heart attack, significant opioid poisoning. |
| NACA VI | respiratory and/or cardiac arrest | --- |
| NACA VII | death | --- |
