= Fungal pneumonia =

Infection of the lungs by fungi

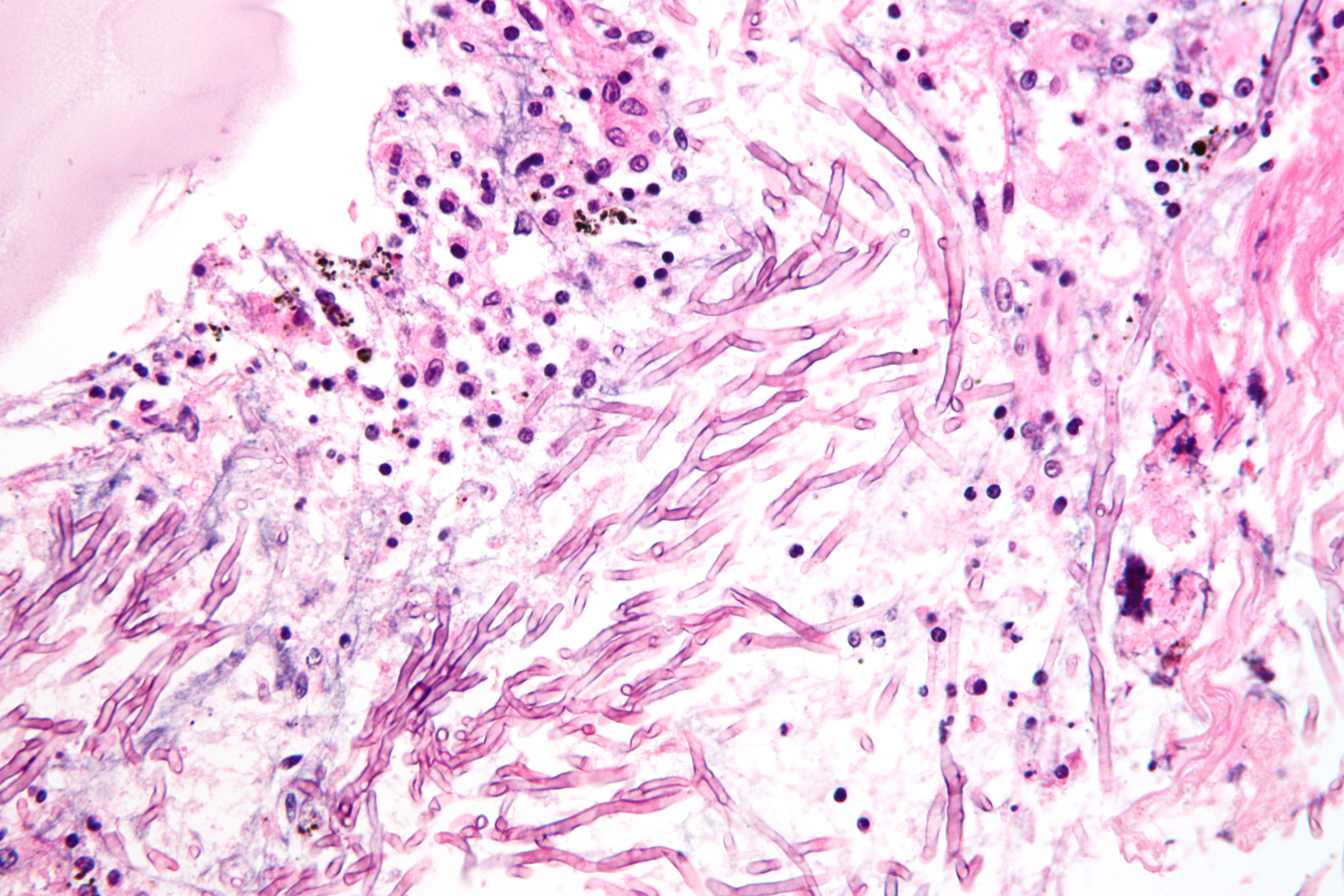
- H&E stain showing a fungal pneumonia (pulmonary aspergillosis)
- Specialty: Infectious disease, respirology

Fungal pneumonia is an infection of the lungs by fungi. It can be caused by either endemic or opportunistic fungi or a combination of both. Case mortality in fungal pneumonias can be as high as 90% in immunocompromised patients, though immunocompetent patients generally respond well to anti-fungal therapy.

== Signs and symptoms ==
Fungal pneumonia can present similarly to that of the common flu or other common illnesses. Symptoms often include fever, cough, headaches, rashes, muscle aches, and/or joint pain. This can lead to treatment being delayed or unsought altogether.

In a very small portion of people, fungal pneumonia can lead to chronic pneumonia, fungemia (presence of fungi in the blood), meningitis (infection of the meninges of the brain or spine), or even death. However, this is extremely rare and the vast majority of cases go untreated, unreported, or are asymptomatic (e.g. the infected person is not aware they are or were infected).

== Causes ==
Specific instances of fungal infections that can manifest with pulmonary involvement include:

- Coccidioidomycosis, which begins with an often self-limited respiratory infection (also called "Valley fever" or "San Joaquin fever")
- Pneumocystis pneumonia, which typically occurs in immunocompromised people, especially AIDS
- Sporotrichosis — primarily a skin disease, but can involve the lungs as well
- Cryptococcus species can sometimes invade the lungs
- Aspergillosis, resulting in invasive pulmonary aspergillosis
- rarely, candidiasis has pulmonary manifestations in immunocompromised patients.
- Histoplasmosis or Spelunker's lung, endemic to Ohio and Mississippi River Valleys, worldwide distribution
- Blastomycosis, or Gilchrist's lung, endemic to Ohio and Mississippi River Valleys, the Great Lakes region, less frequently in Northern Africa and the Middle East

== Pathophysiology ==
Fungi typically enter the lung with inhalation of their spores, though they can reach the lung through the bloodstream if other parts of the body are infected. Also, fungal pneumonia can be caused by reactivation of a latent infection. Once inside the alveoli, fungi travel into the spaces between the cells and also between adjacent alveoli through connecting pores. This invasion triggers the immune system to respond by sending white blood cells responsible for attacking microorganisms (neutrophils) to the lungs. The neutrophils engulf and kill the offending organisms but also release cytokines which result in a general activation of the immune system. This results in the fever, chills, and fatigue common in bacterial and fungal pneumonia. The neutrophils and fluid leaked from surrounding blood vessels fill the alveoli and result in impaired oxygen transportation.

== Diagnosis ==
Fungal pneumonia can be diagnosed in a number of ways. The simplest and cheapest method is to culture the fungus from a patient's respiratory fluids. However, such tests are not only insensitive but take time to develop which is a major drawback because studies have shown that slow diagnosis of fungal pneumonia is linked to high mortality. Microscopy is another method but is also slow and imprecise. Supplementing these classical methods is the detection of antigens. This technique is significantly faster but can be less sensitive and specific than the classical methods.

== Treatment ==
Fungal pneumonia can be treated with antifungal drugs and sometimes by surgical debridement.

== See also ==
- Pneumonia
