= Wells score =

The Wells score may refer to one of two clinical prediction rules in clinical medicine:

- Wells score for deep vein thrombosis
- Wells' score for pulmonary embolism
