= Ottawa ankle rules =

Medical guidelines

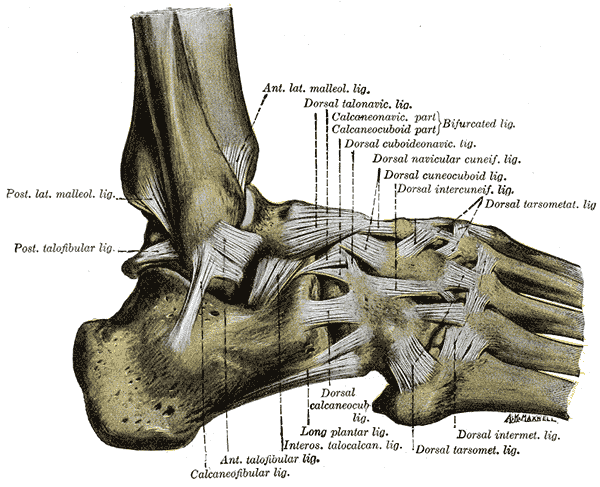
Ligaments of the ankle.

In medicine, the Ottawa ankle rules are a set of guidelines for clinicians to help decide if a patient with foot or ankle pain should be offered X-rays to diagnose a possible bone fracture. Before the introduction of the rules most patients with ankle injuries would have been imaged. However the vast majority of patients with unclear ankle injuries do not have bone fractures. As a result, many unnecessary X-rays were taken, which was costly, time-consuming and a slight health risk due to radiation exposure.

== The Ottawa ankle rules ==
=== Ankle X-ray ===
Ankle X-ray is only required if:

- There is any pain in the malleolar zone; and,
- Any one of the following:
  - Bone tenderness along the distal 6 cm of the posterior edge of the tibia or tip of the medial malleolus, OR
  - Bone tenderness along the distal 6 cm of the posterior edge of the fibula or tip of the lateral malleolus, OR
  - An inability to bear weight both immediately and in the emergency department for four steps.

=== Foot X-ray series ===
Additionally, the Ottawa ankle rules indicate whether a foot X-ray series is required. It states that it is indicated if:

- There is any pain in the midfoot zone; and,
- Any one of the following:
  - Bone tenderness at the base of the fifth metatarsal (for foot injuries), OR
  - Bone tenderness at the navicular bone (for foot injuries), OR
  - An inability to bear weight both immediately and in the emergency department for four steps.

Certain groups are excluded, in particular pregnant women, and those with diminished ability to follow the test (for example due to head injury or intoxication). Several studies strongly support the use of the Ottawa Ankle Rules in children over 6 (98.5% sensitivity); however, their usefulness in younger children has not yet been thoroughly examined.

== Usefulness ==
The rules have been found to have a very high sensitivity, moderate specificity, and therefore a very low rate of false negatives. Evidence supports the rules as an accurate instrument for excluding fractures of the ankle and mid-foot, reducing the number of unnecessary investigations and length of stay in emergency departments.

The original study reported that the test was 100% sensitive and reduced the number of ankle X-rays by 36%. A second trial with a larger number of patients replicated these findings. Subsequently, a multi-centre study explored the feasibility of implementing the rules on a wider scale. Teaching the rules to patients does not appear to help reduce presentation to hospital.

== History ==
This list of rules was published in 1992 by a team of doctors in the emergency department of the Ottawa Civic Hospital in Ottawa, Canada. Since the rules were formulated in Ottawa they were dubbed the Ottawa ankle rules by their creators a few years after their development, a title that has stuck. In this respect, the naming of the rules is similar to that of the Bristol stool scale or the Glasgow Coma Scale (GCS), which also take their names from the cities in which they were formulated.

== Related rules ==
The original rules were developed for ankle and foot injuries only, but similar guidelines have been developed for other injuries such as the Ottawa knee rules.
