= British Thoracic Society =

Charitable organization

- Abbreviation: BTS
- Formation: 1982
- Legal status: Registered charity and limited company
- Purpose: Thoracic medicine (pulmonology) in the UK
- Location(s): London, WC1; United Kingdom
- Region served: UK
- Members: Respiratory medical professionals in the UK
- Chief Executive: Sally Welham
- Website: BTS

The British Thoracic (Note: see Thorax) Society (BTS) was formed in 1982 by the amalgamation of the British Thoracic Association and the Thoracic Society. It is a registered charity and a company limited by guarantee.

== Function ==
The Society's main charitable objective is to improve the care of people with respiratory disorders, which it aims to achieve by:

- promoting optimum standards of care (the website contains treatment Guidelines, good practice guides and related audit tools)
- promoting and advancing knowledge about the causes, prevention and treatment of respiratory diseases (the Society runs two large conferences each year and a range of short courses)
- promoting and disseminating research (the Society's Winter Meeting is the main showcase for this activity, as well as the journal Thorax, published jointly with the British Medical Journal, and the Respiratory Futures website.

== Structure ==
BTS is a membership organisation, with over 4,700 members from the respiratory health sector (as of December 2022). These include doctors, nurses, physiotherapists, pharmacists, speech and language therapists, scientists and other professionals with an interest in respiratory disease.

The Society also works in partnership with a range of organisations to achieve its objectives. These partners include other respiratory health professional groups, organisations representing patients and carers, medical and surgical Royal Colleges and other specialist societies.

== Meetings and short course programmes ==
BTS holds two annual conferences; the Summer Meeting in the last week of June and the Winter Meeting which takes place at the Queen Elizabeth II Conference Centre in London at the end of November. These Meetings bring together medical professionals with an interest in respiratory medicine.

The Summer Meeting has a main focus on education and training, with clinical updates and the opportunity for a multi-disciplinary audience to discuss key issues and share good practice.

The BTS Winter Meeting attracts over 2000 delegates each year and is the UK's primary respiratory scientific meeting, with the emphasis on presenting updates on current respiratory research and symposia from leading researchers from all over the world. Young Investigators and Medical Students are encouraged to put forward abstracts and prizes are awarded in each category.

There is also a wide-ranging programme of short courses, many of which are now available to complete online.

== See also ==
- British Medical Journal (BMJ)
