= Anatomical terms of muscle =

Muscles terminology

Anatomical terminology is used to uniquely describe aspects of skeletal muscle, cardiac muscle, and smooth muscle such as their actions, structure, size, and location.

== Types ==
There are three types of muscle tissue in the body: skeletal, smooth, and cardiac.

=== Skeletal muscle ===
Skeletal muscle, or "voluntary muscle", is a striated muscle tissue that primarily joins to bone with tendons. Skeletal muscle enables movement of bones, and maintains posture. The widest part of a muscle that pulls on the tendons is known as the belly.

==== Muscle slip ====
A muscle slip is a slip of muscle that can either be an anatomical variant, or a branching of a muscle as in rib connections of the serratus anterior muscle.

=== Smooth muscle ===
Smooth muscle is involuntary and found in parts of the body where it conveys action without conscious intent. The majority of this type of muscle tissue is found in the digestive and urinary systems where it acts by propelling forward food, chyme, and feces in the former and urine in the latter. Other places smooth muscle can be found are within the uterus, where it helps facilitate birth, and the eye, where the pupillary sphincter controls pupil size.

=== Cardiac muscle ===
Cardiac muscle is specific to the heart. It is also involuntary in its movement, and is additionally self-excitatory, contracting without outside stimuli.

== Actions of skeletal muscle ==
As well as anatomical terms of motion, which describe the motion made by a muscle, unique terminology is used to describe the action of a set of muscles.

=== Agonists and antagonists ===
Agonist muscles and antagonist muscles are muscles that cause or inhibit a movement.

Agonist muscles are also called prime movers since they produce most of the force, and control of an action. Agonists cause a movement to occur through their own activation. For example, the triceps brachii contracts, producing a shortening (concentric) contraction, during the up phase of a push-up (elbow extension). During the down phase of a push-up, the same triceps brachii actively controls elbow flexion while producing a lengthening (eccentric) contraction. It is still the agonist, because while resisting gravity during relaxing, the triceps brachii continues to be the prime mover, or controller, of the joint action.

Another example is the dumb-bell curl at the elbow. The elbow flexor group is the agonist, shortening during the lifting phase (elbow flexion). During the lowering phase the elbow flexor muscles lengthen, remaining the agonists because they are controlling the load and the movement (elbow extension). For both the lifting and lowering phase, the "elbow extensor" muscles are the antagonists (see below). They lengthen during the dumbbell lifting phase and shorten during the dumbbell lowering phase. Here it is important to understand that it is common practice to give a name to a muscle group (e.g. elbow flexors) based on the joint action they produce during a shortening contraction. However, this naming convention does not mean they are only agonists during shortening. This term typically describes the function of skeletal muscles.

Antagonist muscles are simply the muscles that produce an opposing joint torque to the agonist muscles. This torque can aid in controlling a motion. The opposing torque can slow movement down - especially in the case of a ballistic movement. For example, during a very rapid (ballistic) discrete movement of the elbow, such as throwing a dart, the triceps muscles will be activated very briefly and strongly (in a "burst") to rapidly accelerate the extension movement at the elbow, followed almost immediately by a "burst" of activation to the elbow flexor muscles that decelerates the elbow movement to arrive at a quick stop. To use an automotive analogy, this would be similar to pressing the accelerator pedal rapidly and then immediately pressing the brake. Antagonism is not an intrinsic property of a particular muscle or muscle group; it is a role that a muscle plays depending on which muscle is currently the agonist. During slower joint actions that involve gravity, just as with the agonist muscle, the antagonist muscle can shorten and lengthen. Using the example of the triceps brachii during a push-up, the elbow flexor muscles are the antagonists at the elbow during both the up phase and down phase of the movement. During the dumbbell curl, the elbow extensors are the antagonists for both the lifting and lowering phases.

=== Antagonistic pairs ===
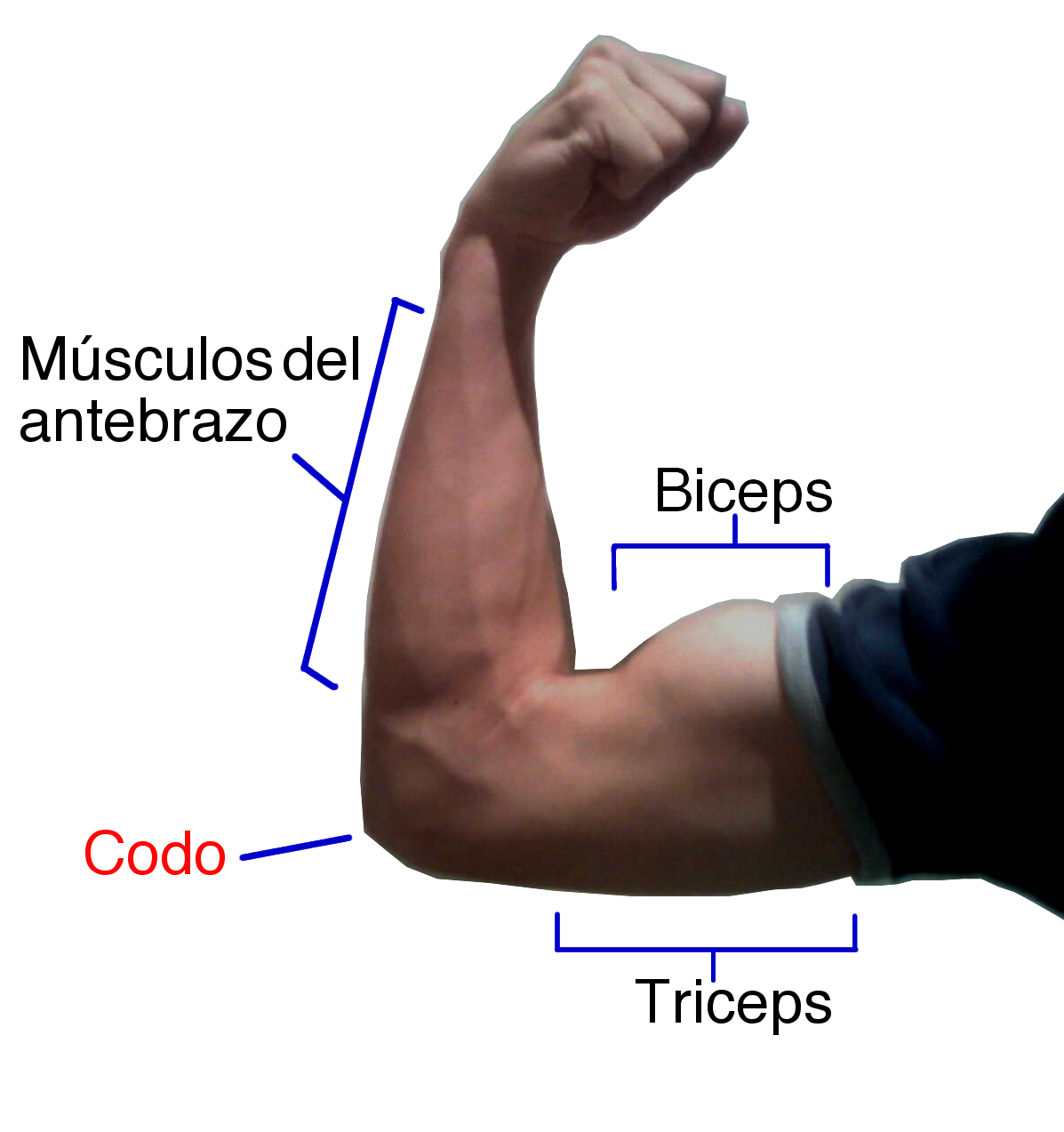
The antagonistic pair of biceps and triceps working to flex the elbow.

Antagonist and agonist muscles often occur in pairs, called antagonistic pairs. As one muscle contracts, the other relaxes. An example of an antagonistic pair is the biceps and triceps; to contract, the triceps relaxes while the biceps contracts to lift the arm. "Reverse motions" need antagonistic pairs located in opposite sides of a joint or bone, including abductor-adductor pairs and flexor-extensor pairs. These consist of an extensor muscle, which "opens" the joint (by increasing the angle between the two bones) and a flexor muscle, which does the opposite by decreasing the angle between two bones.

However, muscles do not always work this way; sometimes agonists and antagonists contract at the same time to produce force, as per Lombard's paradox. Also, sometimes during a joint action controlled by an agonist muscle, the antagonist will be slightly activated, naturally. This occurs normally and is not considered to be a problem unless it is excessive or uncontrolled and disturbs the control of the joint action. This is called agonist/antagonist co-activation and serves to mechanically stiffen the joint.

Not all muscles are paired in this way. An example of an exception is the deltoid.

=== Synergists ===
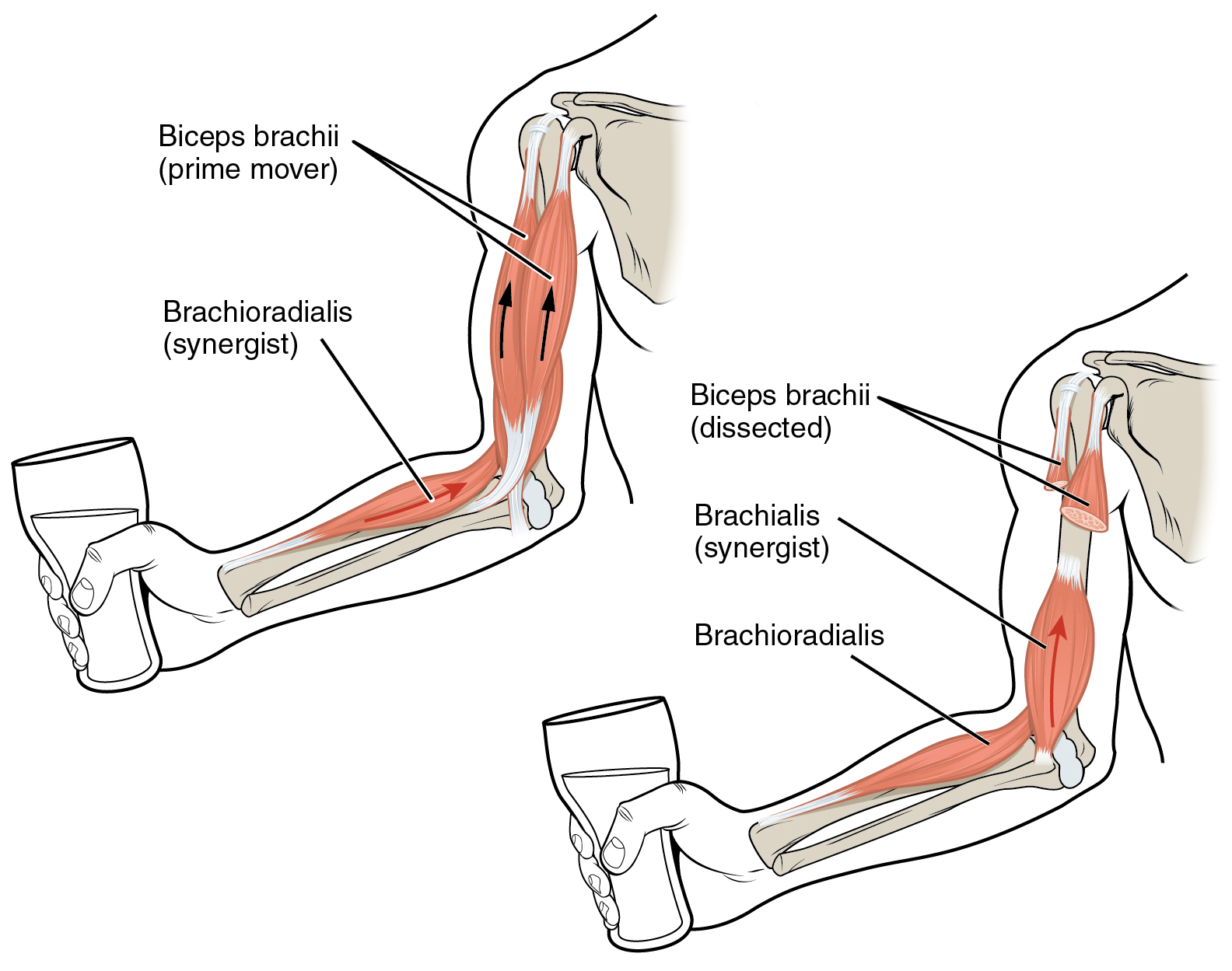
The biceps flexes the lower arm. The brachioradialis, in the forearm, and brachialis, located deep to the biceps in the upper arm, are both synergists that aid in this motion.

Synergist muscles also called fixators, act around a joint to help the action of an agonist muscle. Synergist muscles can also act to counter or neutralize the force of an agonist and are also known as neutralizers when they do this. As neutralizers they help to cancel out or neutralize extra motion produced from the agonists to ensure that the force generated works within the desired plane of motion.

Muscle fibers can only contract up to 40% of their fully stretched length. Thus the short fibers of pennate muscles are more suitable where power rather than range of contraction is required. This limitation in the range of contraction affects all muscles, and those that act over several joints may be unable to shorten sufficiently to produce the full range of movement at all of them simultaneously (active insufficiency, e.g., the fingers cannot be fully flexed when the wrist is also flexed). Likewise, the opposing muscles may be unable to stretch sufficiently to allow such movement to take place (passive insufficiency). For both these reasons, it is often essential to use other synergists, in this type of action to fix certain of the joints so that others can be moved effectively, e.g., fixation of the wrist during full flexion of the fingers in clenching the fist. Synergists are muscles that facilitate the fixation action.

There is an important difference between a helping synergist muscle and a true synergist muscle. A true synergist muscle is one that only neutralizes an undesired joint action, whereas a helping synergist is one that neutralizes an undesired action but also assists with the desired action.

=== Neutralizer action ===
A muscle that fixes or holds a bone so that the agonist can carry out the intended movement is said to have a neutralizing action. A good famous example of this are the hamstrings; the semitendinosus and semimembranosus muscles perform knee flexion and knee internal rotation whereas the biceps femoris carries out knee flexion and knee external rotation. For the knee to flex while not rotating in either direction, all three muscles contract to stabilize the knee while it moves in the desired way.

==== Composite muscle ====
Composite or hybrid muscles have more than one set of fibers that perform the same function, and are usually supplied by different nerves for different set of fibers. For example, the tongue itself is a composite muscle made up of various components like longitudinal, transverse, horizontal muscles with different parts innervated from a different nerve supply.

== Muscle naming ==
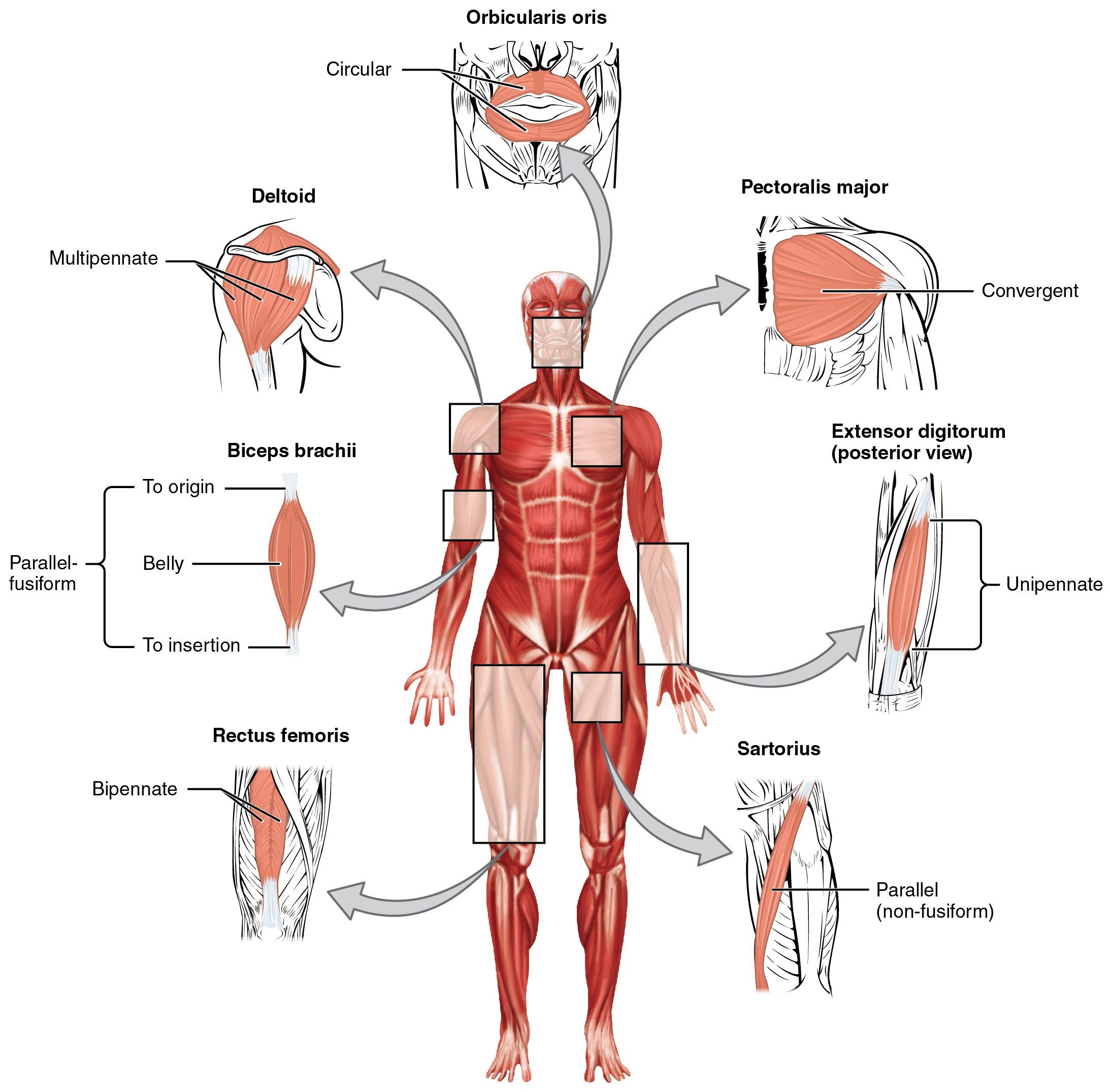
The seven general types of skeletal muscle

There are a number of terms used in the naming of muscles including those relating to size, shape, action, location, their orientation, and their number of heads.

By size
brevis means short; longus means long; major means large; maximus means largest; minor means small, and minimus smallest. These terms are often used after the particular muscle such as gluteus maximus, and gluteus minimus.
By shape
deltoid means triangular; quadratus means having four sides; rhomboideus means having a rhomboid shape; teres means round or cylindrical, trapezius means having a trapezoid shape, rectus means straight. Examples are the pronator teres, the pronator quadratus and the rectus abdominis.
By action
abductor moving away from the midline; adductor moving towards the midline; depressor moving downwards; elevator moving upwards; flexor moving that decreases an angle; extensor moving that increase an angle or straightens; pronator moving to face down; supinator moving to face upwards; Internal rotator rotating towards the body; external rotator rotating away from the body.

== Form ==
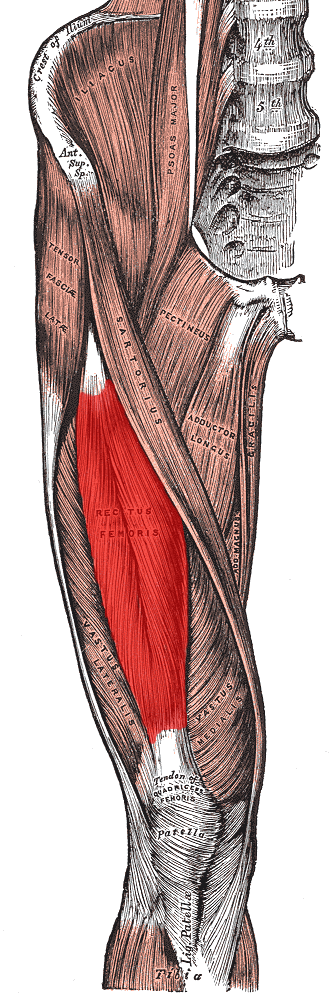
Rectus femoris (in red). Origin includes the anterior inferior iliac spine and part of the acetabulum. Insertion is into the patellar tendon. Action is extension of the knee and flexion of the hip.

=== Insertion and origin ===
The insertion and origin of a muscle are the two places where it is anchored, one at each end. The connective tissue of the attachment is called an enthesis.

==== Origin ====
The origin of a muscle is the bone, typically proximal, which has greater mass and is more stable during a contraction than a muscle's insertion. For example, with the latissimus dorsi muscle, the origin site is the torso, and the insertion is the arm. When this muscle contracts, normally the arm moves due to having less mass than the torso. This is the case when grabbing objects lighter than the body, as in the typical use of a lat pull down machine. This can be reversed however, such as in a chin up where the torso moves up to meet the arm.

The head of a muscle, also called caput musculi is the part at the end of a muscle at its origin, where it attaches to a fixed bone. Some muscles such as the biceps have more than one head.

==== Insertion ====
The insertion of a muscle is the structure that it attaches to and tends to be moved by the contraction of the muscle. This may be a bone, a tendon or the subcutaneous dermal connective tissue. Insertions are usually connections of muscle via tendon to bone. The insertion is a bone that tends to be distal, have less mass, and greater motion than the origin during a contraction.

==== Intrinsic and extrinsic muscles ====
Intrinsic muscles have their origin in the part of the body that they act on, and are contained within that part. Extrinsic muscles have their origin outside of the part of the body that they act on. Examples are the intrinsic and extrinsic muscles of the tongue, and those of the hand.

=== Muscle fibres ===
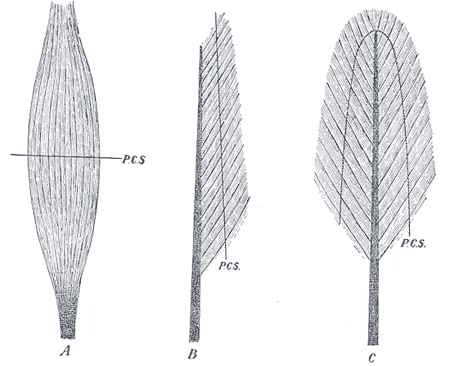
Different skeletal muscle types: A: fusiform. B: unipennate. C: bipennate. (PCS: physiological cross-section)

Muscles may also be described by the direction that the muscle fibres run, in their muscle architecture.

- Fusiform muscles have fibres that run parallel to the length of the muscle, and are spindle-shaped. For example, the pronator teres muscle of the forearm.
- Unipennate muscles have fibres that run the entire length of only one side of a muscle, like a quill pen. For example, the fibularis muscles.
- Bipennate muscles consist of two rows of oblique muscle fibres, facing in opposite diagonal directions, converging on a central tendon. Bipennate muscle is stronger than both unipennate muscle and fusiform muscle, due to a larger physiological cross-sectional area. Bipennate muscle shortens less than unipennate muscle but develops greater tension when it does, translated into greater power but less range of motion. Pennate muscles generally also tire easily. Examples of bipennate muscles are the rectus femoris muscle of the thigh, and the stapedius muscle of the middle ear.

== State ==
=== Hypertrophy and atrophy ===
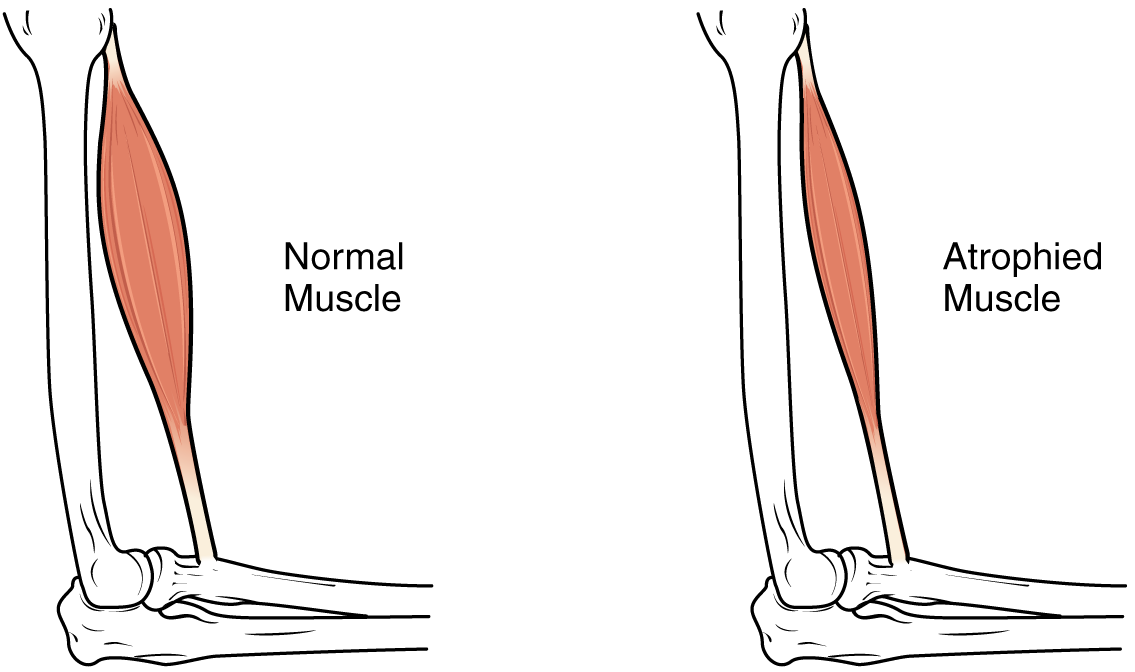
Example of an atrophied muscle

Hypertrophy is increase in muscle size from an increase in size of individual muscle cells. This usually occurs as a result of exercise.

== See also ==
- Reciprocal inhibition
- Anatomical terms of bone
- Anatomical terms of neuroanatomy
