= Muscle architecture =

Physical arrangement of muscle fibers at the macroscopic level

Muscle architecture is the physical arrangement of muscle fibers at the macroscopic level that determines a muscle's mechanical function. There are several different muscle architecture types including: parallel, pennate and hydrostats. Force production and gearing vary depending on the different muscle parameters such as muscle length, fiber length, pennation angle, and the physiological cross-sectional area (PCSA).

== Architecture types ==
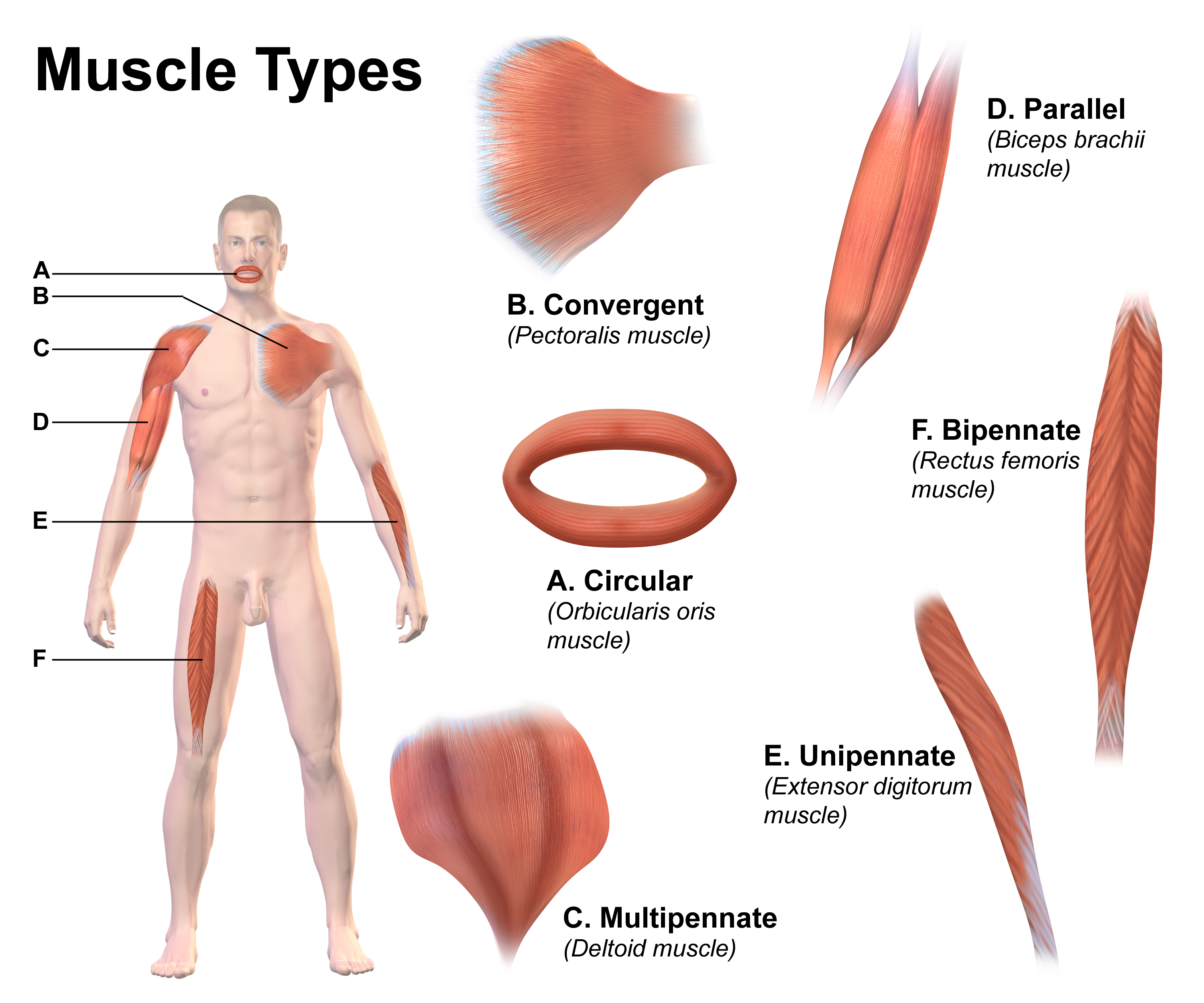
Some types of muscle architecture

Parallel and pennate (also known as pinnate) are two main types of muscle architecture. A third subcategory, muscular hydrostats, can also be considered. Architecture type is determined by the direction in which the muscle fibers are oriented relative to the force-generating axis. The force produced by a given muscle is proportional to the cross-sectional area, or the number of parallel sarcomeres present.

=== Parallel ===
The parallel muscle architecture is found in muscles where the fibers are parallel to the force-generating axis. These muscles are often used for fast or extensive movements and can be measured by the anatomical cross-sectional area (ACSA). Parallel muscles can be further defined into three main categories: strap, fusiform, or fan-shaped.

==== Strap ====
Strap muscles are shaped like a strap or belt and have fibers that run longitudinally to the contraction direction. These muscles have broad attachments compared to other muscle types and can shorten to about 40–60% of their resting length. Strap muscles, such as the laryngeal muscles, have been thought to control the fundamental frequency used in speech production, as well as singing. Another example of this muscle is the longest muscle in the human body, the sartorius.

==== Fusiform ====
Fusiform muscles are wider and cylindrically shaped in the center and taper off at the ends. This overall shape of fusiform muscles is often referred to as a spindle. The line of action in this muscle type runs in a straight line between the attachment points which are often tendons. Due to the shape, the force produced by fusiform muscles is concentrated into a small area. An example of this architecture type is the biceps brachii in humans.

==== Convergent ====
The fibers in convergent, or triangular muscles converge at one end (typically at a tendon) and spread over a broad area at the other end in a fan-shape. Convergent muscles, such as the pectoralis major in humans, have a weaker pull on the attachment site compared to other parallel fibers due to their broad nature. These muscles are considered versatile because of their ability to change the direction of pull depending on how the fibers are contracting.

Typically, convergent muscles experience varying degrees of fiber strain. This is largely due to the different lengths and varying insertion points of the muscle fibers. Studies on ratfish have looked at the strain on these muscles that have a twisted tendon. It has been found that strain becomes uniform over the face of a convergent muscle with the presence of a twisted tendon.

=== Pennate ===
Unlike in parallel muscles, fibers in pennate muscles are at an angle to the force-generating axis (pennation angle) and usually insert into a central tendon. Because of this structure, fewer sarcomeres can be found in series, resulting in a shorter fiber length. This further allows for more fibers to be present in a given muscle; however, a trade-off exists between the number of fibers present and force transmission. The force produced by pennate muscles is greater than the force produced by parallel muscles. Since pennate fibers insert at an angle, the anatomical cross-sectional area cannot be used as in parallel fibered muscles. Instead, the physiological cross-sectional area (PCSA) must be used for pennate muscles. Pennate muscles can be further divided into uni-, bi- or multipennate.

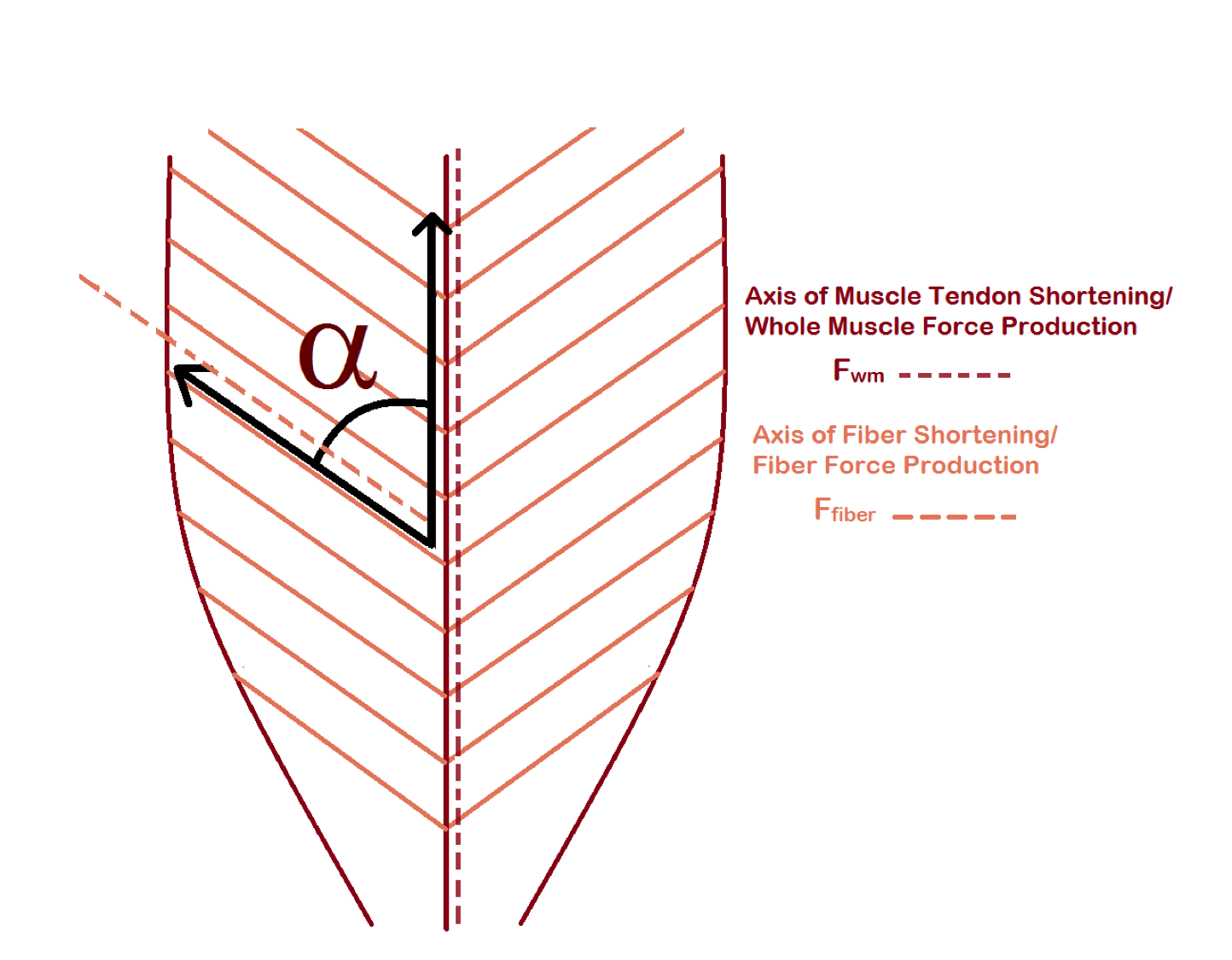
Fiber angle of a pennate muscle

==== Unipennate ====
Unipennate muscles are those where the muscle fibers are oriented at one fiber angle to the force-generating axis and are all on the same side of a tendon. The pennation angle in unipennate muscles has been measured at a variety of resting length and typically varies from 0° to 30°. The lateral gastrocnemius is an example of this muscle architecture.

==== Bipennate ====
Muscles that have fibers on two sides of a tendon are considered bipennate. The stapedius in the middle ear of humans, as well as the rectus femoris of the quadriceps are examples of bipennate muscles.

==== Multipennate ====
The third type of pennate subgroup is known as the multipennate architecture. These muscles, such as the deltoid muscle in the shoulder of humans, have fibers that are oriented at multiple angles along the force-generating axis.

=== Hydrostats ===
Muscular hydrostats function independently of a hardened skeletal system. Muscular hydrostats are typically supported by a membrane of connective tissue which holds the volume constant. Retaining a constant volume enables the fibers to stabilize the muscle's structure that would otherwise require skeletal support. Muscle fibers change the shape of the muscle by contracting along three general lines of action relative to the long axis: parallel, perpendicular and helical. These contractions can apply or resist compressive forces to the overall structure. A balance of synchronized, compressive and resistive forces along the three lines of action, enable the muscle to move in diverse and complex ways.

Contraction of helical fibers causes elongation and shortening of the hydrostat. Unilateral contraction of these muscles can cause a bending movement. Helical fibers can oriented into either left or right-handed arrangements. Contraction of orthogonal fibers causes torsion or twisting of the hydrostat.

== Force generation ==
Muscle architecture directly influences force production via muscle volume, fiber length, fiber type and pennation angle.

Muscle volume is determined by the cross-sectional area. Anatomical cross-sectional area is

$CSA = \frac {V}{l}$

where

- $\textstyle V$ stands for volume
- $\textstyle l$ stands for length

In muscles, a more accurate measurement of CSA is physiological CSA (PCSA) which takes into account fiber angle.

$PCSA = \frac{m \cdot \cos \theta}{l \cdot \rho}$

where

- $\textstyle m$ stands for muscle mass
- $\textstyle \theta$ stands for the fiber angle
- $\textstyle l$ stands for fiber length
- $\textstyle \rho$ stands for muscle density

PCSA relates the force produced by the muscle to the summation of the forces produced along the force generating axis of each muscle fiber and is largely determined by the pennation angle.

Fiber length is also a key variable in muscle anatomy. Fiber length is the product of both the number of sarcomeres in series in the fiber and their individual lengths. As a fiber changes length, the individual sarcomeres shorten or lengthen, but the total number does not change (except on long timescales following exercise and conditioning). To standardize fiber length, length is measured at the peak of the length-tension relationship (L0), ensuring all sarcomeres are at the same length. Fiber length (at L0) does not affect force generation, much as the strength of a chain is unaffected by the length. Similarly, increased fiber cross-section or multiple fibers increase the force, like having multiple chains in parallel. Velocity is affected in the reverse manner – because sarcomeres shorten at a certain percentage per second under a certain force, fibers with more sarcomeres will have higher absolute (but not relative) velocities. Muscles with short fibers will have higher PCSA per unit muscle mass, thus greater force production, while muscle with long fibers will have lower PCSA per unit muscle mass, thus lower force production. However, muscles with longer fibers will shorten at greater absolute speeds than a similar muscle with shorter fibers.

The type of muscle fiber correlates to force production. Type I fibers are slow oxidative with a slow rise in force and an overall low force production. The type I fibers have a smaller fiber diameter and exhibit a slow contraction. Type IIa fibers are fast oxidative which exhibit fast contraction and a fast rise in force. These fibers have fast contraction times and maintain some, though not a great amount of their force production with repeated activity due to being moderately fatigue resistant. Type IIb fibers are fast glycolytic which also exhibit fast contraction and fast rise in force. These fibers display extremely large force production, but are easily fatigued and therefore unable to maintain force for more than a few contractions without rest.

=== Pennation angle ===
The pennation angle is the angle between the longitudinal axis of the entire muscle and its fibers. The longitudinal axis is the force generating axis of the muscle and pennate fibers lie at an oblique angle. As tension increases in the muscle fibers, the pennation angle also increases. A greater pennation angle results in a smaller force being transmitted to the tendon.

Muscle architecture affects the force-velocity relationship. Components of this relationship are fiber length, number of sarcomeres and pennation angle. In pennate muscles, for example, as the fibers shorten, the pennation angle increases as the fibers pivot which affects the amount of force generated.

== Architectural gear ratio ==
Architectural gear ratio (AGR) relates the contractile velocity of an entire muscle to the contractile velocity of a single muscle fiber. AGR is determined by the mechanical demands of a muscle during movement. Changes in pennation angle allow for variable gearing in pennate muscles. Variable pennation angle also influences whole-muscle geometry during contraction. The degree of fiber rotation determines the cross-sectional area during the course of the movement which can result in increases of the thickness or width of the muscle. Pennation angle can be modified through exercise interventions.

	High gear ratio	Low gear ratio
Contraction velocity ratio (muscle/fiber)	Whole muscle ≫ muscle fiber	Approximately 1:1 ratio
Force developed by whole muscle	Low-force contractions	High-force contractions
Velocity developed by whole muscle	High-velocity contractions	Low-velocity contractions
Pennation angle (fiber rotation)	Increase in pennation angle	Minute or no decrease in pennation angle
Cross-sectional variance	Increase thickness (increase distance between aponeuroses)	Decrease thickness (decrease distance between aponeuroses)

A high gear ratio occurs when the contraction velocity of the whole muscle is much greater than that of an individual muscle fiber, resulting in a gear ratio that is greater than 1. A high gear ratio will result in low force, high velocity contractions of the entire muscle. The angle of pennation will increase during contraction accompanied by an increase in thickness. Thickness is defined as the area between the aponeuroses of the muscle. A low gear ratio occurs when the contraction velocity of the whole muscle and individual fibers is approximately the same, resulting in a gear ratio of 1. Conditions resulting in a low gear ratio include high force and low velocity contraction of the whole muscle. The pennation angle typically shows little variation. The muscle thickness will decrease.
