= Osteochondrosis =

Family of orthopedic diseases of the joint

- Specialty: Rheumatology, orthopedic surgery

Osteochondrosis is a family of orthopedic diseases of the joint that occur in children, adolescents and rapidly growing animals, particularly pigs, horses, dogs, and broiler chickens. They are characterized by interruption of the blood supply of a bone, in particular to the epiphysis, followed by localized bony necrosis, and later, regrowth of the bone. This disorder is defined as a focal disturbance of endochondral ossification and is regarded as having a multifactorial cause, so no one thing accounts for all aspects of this disease.

Osteochondrosis is a developmental disease. It usually occurs in an early stage of life. It has personified features as focal chondronecrosis and confinement of growth cartilage due to a failing of endochondral ossification. Fissures can develop from lesions over the top articular cartilage and form a cartilage flap and an osteochondral fragment. It is diagnosed as osteochondritis dissecans.

== In animals ==
In dogs osteochondrosis is seen in elbow, shoulder, knee, and ankle joints. Elbow osteochondrosis is also known as elbow dysplasia. There are three types of elbow dysplasia: fragmented medial coronoid process, ununited anconeal process and osteochondritis dissecans of the medial humeral condyle.

Breeds with a predisposition to these conditions are Basset Hound, Labrador Retriever, Golden Retriever, and Rottweiler. Other breeds can also be diagnosed with this condition but it is not common.

One primary factor in some cases of elbow osteochondrosis is when the radius and ulna grow at different rates. In this situation, the stress to the joint surface is not even and can cause some form of osteochondrosis in the elbow when the puppy grows or make already existing elbow dysplasia even worse. Some susceptible breeds include Dachshunds, Corgis, Pugs, Bulldogs, and Beagles.

== Signs and symptoms ==
These conditions nearly all present with an insidious onset of pain referred to the location of the bony damage. Some, notably Kienböck's disease of the wrist, may involve considerable swelling, and Legg-Calvé-Perthes disease of the hip causes the victim to limp. The spinal form, Scheuermann's disease, may cause bending, or kyphosis of the upper spine, giving a "hunch-back" appearance.

=== Symptoms in animals ===
The most common symptoms are lameness and pain in the affected joints. Animals may try to ease the pain by walking differently and the pain can be noticed by a change in the animal's gait. The condition affects both sides (right and left leg). On most occasions, the other leg is worse. This can result in the dog starting to encumber the other leg and the healthier leg becomes more strained. Sometimes the symptoms can be mild or there may be no symptoms, which can make it hard to detect a problem.

== Cause ==
The ultimate cause for these conditions is unknown, but the most commonly cited cause factors are rapid growth, heredity, trauma (or overuse), anatomic conformation, and dietary imbalances; however, only anatomic conformation and heredity are well supported by scientific literature. The way that the disease is initiated has been debated. Although failure of chondrocyte differentiation, formation of a fragile cartilage, failure of blood supply to the growth cartilage, and subchondral bone necrosis all have been proposed as the starting point in the pathogenesis, recent literature strongly supports failure of blood supply to growth cartilage as most likely. Osteochondrosis can be usually inherited.

== Factors ==
There are four factors: genetics, environment, diet, and exercise.

Environment is found to be a key factor in osteochondrosis. The environment is related to diet and exercise. If the dog has good facilities to live a healthy life, meaning having a good diet and enough and the right kind of exercise, osteochondrosis may never occur even if there would be genetic susceptibility. Sometimes even if the environmental conditions are optimal, there is still a chance that osteochondrosis will occur in the animal.

Dogs are very susceptible to calcium when they are growing up. Too much calcium in a diet can affect how the bone starts ossifying.

== Diagnosis ==
=== Classification ===
In humans, these conditions may be classified into three groups:

1. Spinal: Scheuermann's disease (of the interspinal joints) which is a curve in the thoracic spine.
2. Articular: Legg-Calvé-Perthes disease (or, avascular necrosis of the femoral head in the hip), Köhler's disease (of the tarsal navicular bone of the foot), Freiberg's infraction (of the second or third metatarsal of the foot and less frequently the first or fourth; sometimes called Freiberg's Infraction or Freiberg's disease), Blount's disease (tibia vara), Kienböck's disease (lunate), Panner's disease (of the capitulum of the elbow). Other entities affecting mostly adults, but sometimes loosely lumped into these conditions include Preiser's disease (scaphoid) and Mueller-Weiss syndrome (tarsal navicular).
3. Non-articular: This group includes Sever's disease (of the calcaneus, or heel), and other conditions not completely characteristic of the osteochondroses, such as Osgood-Schlatter's disease (of the tibial tubercle) and Sinding-Larsen-Johansson syndrome (proximal patellar tendon).

== Treatment ==
There are many different kinds of treatments, such as to remove the loose piece of the leg, or serving the branch of the lumbar muscle and ulna's attachment.

Most of the time if the osteochondrosis is in the shoulder joint, the veterinarian diagnoses it from X-rays or CT scans. Some studies show that osteochondrosis is more common in male dogs than in female dogs.

== Prognosis ==
The term osteochondrosis has been used to describe a wide range of lesions among different species. There are different types of prognosis: latens, which is a lesion restricted to epiphyseal cartilage, manifesta, a lesion paired with a delay in endochondral ossification, and dissecans which is a cleft formation in the articular cartilage. The prognosis for these conditions is very variable, and depends both on the anatomic site and on the time at which it is detected. In some cases of osteochondrosis, such as Sever's disease and Freiberg's infraction, the involved bone may heal in a relatively normal shape and leave the patient asymptomatic. On the contrary, Legg-Calvé-Perthes disease frequently results in a deformed femoral head that leads to arthritis and the need for joint replacement.

== See also ==
- Osteochondritis
- Osteochondritis dissecans
- Osteochondropathy
