= Panner disease =

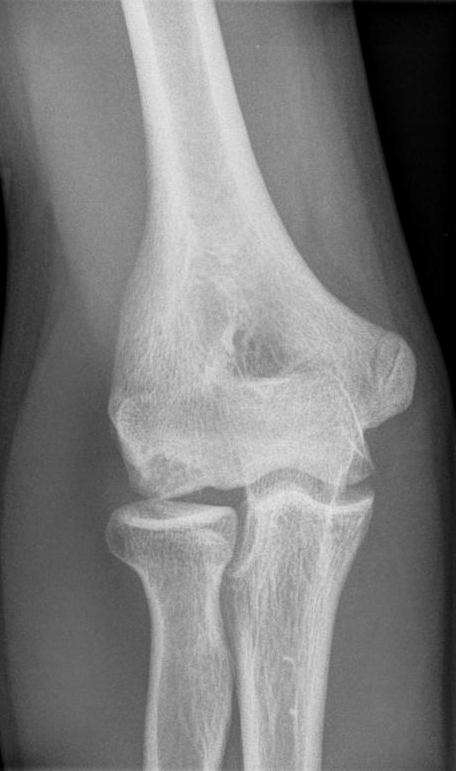
- Morbus Panner Osteonecrosis in condylus radialis humeri

Panner disease is an osteochondrosis of the capitellum of the elbow. Panner disease is primarily seen in boys between the ages of five and ten years old. Panner disease is often caused by excessive throwing due to valgus stress. The disease causes pain and stiffness in the affected elbow and may limit extension; the affected elbow is usually on the dominant arm the child uses. The disease may be associated with pitching and athletic activity. On radiographs, the capitellum may appear irregular with areas of radiolucency. Treatment is symptomatic, with a good prognosis. Treatment is minimal and includes restricting athletic activity to allow for the elbow to heal and for pain to be relieved. The disease is named after the Danish radiologist Hans Jessen Panner (1871–1930).

== Symptoms ==
An individual with Panner disease most commonly experiences elbow pain near the capitellum. Other symptoms include:

- Stiffness in the elbow
- Elbow swelling
- Limited range of motion
- Elbow extension limitation
- Tenderness

These symptoms worsen with physical activity such a throwing a ball or gymnastics for example. The symptoms begin unexpectedly and are often present for several days or weeks, and the symptoms tend to last even longer.

== Causes ==
Being an extremely rare disease, it is unknown as to what exactly causes Panner Disease. It is believed that the disease may be brought on by continuous overuse of the elbow and that puts pressure on the elbow and also strains the elbow in children during the period of rapid bone growth. The overuse of the elbow can be due to the involvement in sports such as baseball, handball, and gymnastics where these sports involve throwing or putting a lot of pressure on the joints. These repeated activities cause microtraumas and results in the affected elbow being swollen, irritated, and in pain. Panner Disease results when the blood supply to the capitellum is disrupted and therefore the cells within the growth plate of the capitellum die and it becomes flat due to the softening and collapsing of the surrounding bone.

== Mechanism ==
The capitellum is the rounded knob on the end of the humerus, and it is held by the radius.

Panner Disease affects the elbow of the arm. At the elbow, the humerus meets the ulna and the radius. The humerus is the long bone that runs from the shoulder to the elbow, and the ulna and radius are the two bones that make up the forearm. The capitellum is the rounded knob on the end of the humerus and it is held by the radius due to the radius's cup-like shape. Panner Disease is part of a family of bone development diseases known as osteochondrosis. In osteochondrosis, the blood supply to an area of developing bone in the dominant elbow is temporarily disrupted by something that is not yet well understood. Therefore, the tissues in the bone are not getting enough blood and they begin to go through necrosis, and they begin to die. Normally, bones grow by the expansion and uniting of the growth plates, but osteochondrosis disrupts this process and the result is cell death and the loss of newly formed tissue. The death of the tissues eventually leads to deterioration of the bone's growth plate. The bone's growth plate is defined as the area at the end of a developing bone where cartilage cells change into bone cells. The bone tissue does regrow, but the necrosis can cause temporary problems in the affected area until the strenuous arm and elbow activity is significantly decreased or stopped for a period of time.

It is believed that Panner disease is a precursor to a similar condition called osteochondritis dissecans of the capitellum (OCD). OCD is different from Panner disease because OCD occurs in older children and it does not involve the growth plate because by the time that OCD occurs the growth plates have already fused and the skeleton has finished growing.

== Diagnosis ==
As the symptoms become prominent, the child will visit their pediatrician or family doctor to confirm whether or not the child has Panner Disease. When the child visits the doctor, the doctor will seek information about the child's age, sports participation, activity level, and what the child's dominant arm is. The affected elbow will be compared to the healthy elbow and any differences between the two will be noted. The location of where the pain is in the elbow, and the child's range of motion and extension will also be determined to make an accurate diagnosis. To check the child's range of motion and extension limitation the child will be asked to move the arm of the affected elbow in various directions. The movement of the arm in various directions will allow the doctor to conclude how good the child is able to move the arm and the doctor will be able to determine if there is pain caused by the various directions of movement.

To confirm the diagnosis, an x-ray or MRI scan will be done. The radiograph will enable the doctor to visualize irregularities and see the shape of the capitellum and also visualize the growth plate. In Panner Disease, the capitellum may appear flat and the bone growth plate will look irregular and fragmented. The areas where bone breakdown has occurred can also be visualized on the radiograph. When the patient undergoes an MRI scan any irregularities of the capitellum will be able to be visualized, and the bone will be able to be visualized in more detail to determine the extent of swelling, if any. In the MRI results for Panner disease, there will be a decreased signal intensity of the capitellum on a T1 series and increased signal intensity on a T2 series.

== Prevention ==
To prevent future instances of Panner Disease the child is instructed to cease all physical and sports activities that involve the use of the affected elbow until the symptoms are relieved

== Treatment ==
The goal of treatment in Panner disease is to relieve pain. Treatment for Panner Disease is very minimal because in most children the bones repair their blood supply and rebuild themselves and this leads to the rebuilding of the growth plate and the capitellum returns to its normal shape. The period of rebuilding and regrowth varies from child to child and can last anywhere between weeks to several months. To relieve the pain, the child is restricted from participating in sports and activities until the elbow is healed and to also rest the affected elbow. Rest will allow for the pain to be relieved and return of full elbow movement. It may also be recommended for children to apply an icepack or heat to the elbow to alleviate pain and swelling. If the child has great difficulty bending and straightening the arm then physical therapy may also be recommended. Occasionally, it is recommended for children to use nonsteroidal anti-inflammatory drugs (NSAIDs) or acetaminophen to also reduce pain and swelling.

== Prognosis ==
For treatment, Panner Disease heals well in children with rest and restriction of physical activity and sports using the affected arm. The prognosis is also good with treatment and the affected capitellum is remodeled. Irregularities of the capitellum and surrounding elbow area can both be seen by radiograph and MRI. When treatment is effective the flattened and fragmented capitellum is completely remodeled and returns to its normal circular shape, and also the high intensity signal on an MRI T2 series disappears. These results indicate that the capitellum is completely remodeled and the child is able to return to normal physical and sports activities.

== Research ==
Although the exact cause of Panner Disease is unknown, in recent research, it has been concluded that it may be associated with frequent throwing or other athletic activity. In the same article that talks about varying osteochondrosis diseases, it is pointed out that Panner Disease always involves alteration of the capitellum, which can be visualized by radiography. In another research article, the research team aimed to summarize the best available evidence for diagnosis and treatment for Panner Disease. In the article it was found that the most common symptoms that patients with Panner Disease present with are elbow stiffness and swelling, limited range of motion, and limited elbow extension. In alignment with the previously mentioned article, the team of researchers also concluded that Panner Disease involves irregularity of the capitellum, specifically that it appears flattened. Panner Disease often gets misdiagnosed as osteochondritis dissecans (OCD), and in this article they distinguish the difference between the two diseases are age difference and radiographic findings. In alignment with the two previously discussed articles, another article that reports on three case studies of Panner Disease, states that the primary treatment that is used for Panner Disease is rest and restriction from all physical and athletic activity that involves the use of the upper extremities; the activity is suggested to be ceased until the symptoms are relieved.
