= Standardbred =

American breed of horse

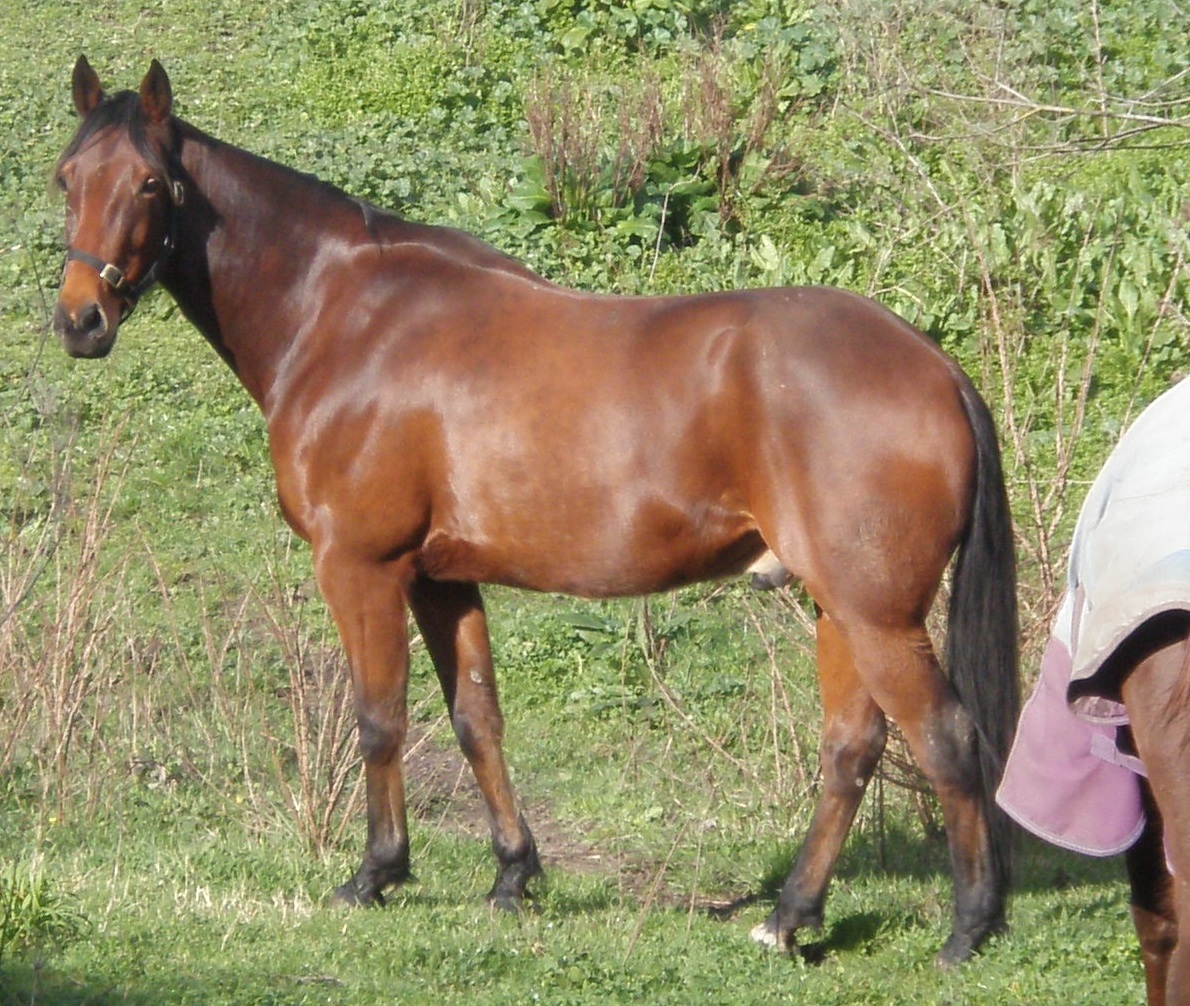

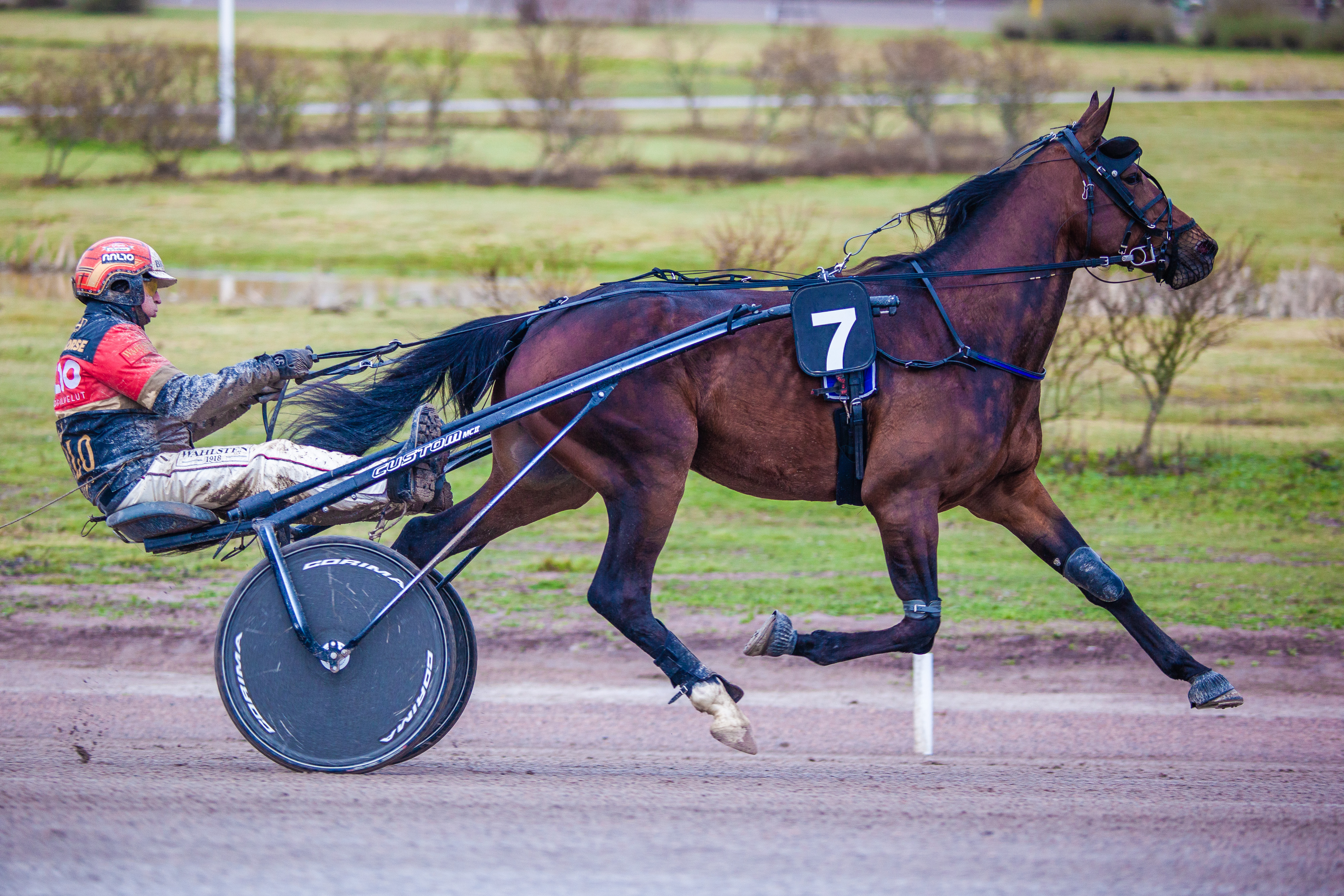
- Other names: STB; American Standardbred; American Trotter
- Country of origin: United States

Traits
- Distinguishing features: Well-muscled, long body, slightly heavier than a Thoroughbred, solid legs and powerful shoulders and hindquarters; able to trot or pace at speed for racing.

Breed standards
- United States Trotting Association

The Standardbred is an American horse breed best known for its ability in harness racing where they compete at either a trot or pace. Developed in North America, the Standardbred is recognized worldwide, and the breed can trace its bloodlines to 18th-century England. They are solid, well-built horses with good dispositions.

== Characteristics ==
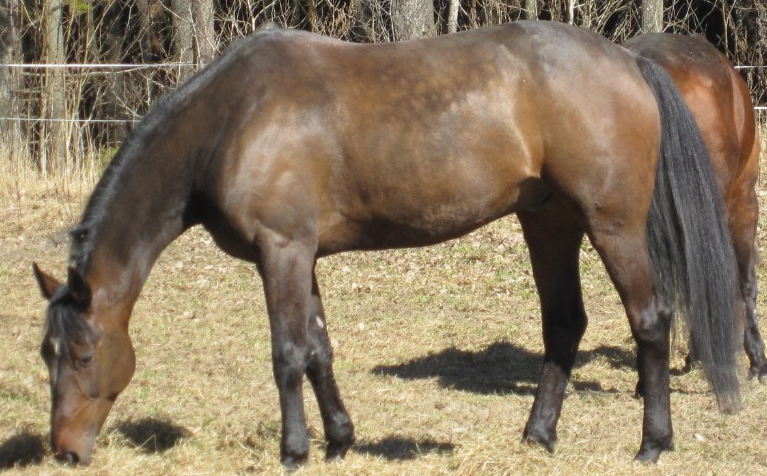
A standardbred

Standardbreds are generally well-muscled and similar to, but a bit heavier than, a Thoroughbred, with a large head often with a Roman nose profile, straight neck, sloping shoulder, defined withers, a deep girth, strong bone (legs) and hard feet. Standardbreds average 15 to 16 hands (60 to 64 inches, 152 to 163 cm) and typically weigh between 800 and 1,000 pounds (360 and 450 kg). They are most often bay, and less frequently brown, black, chestnut, gray or roan. Standardbreds are considered easy-to-train horses with a willing submissive nature.

=== Gaits ===
Standardbreds race either at a trot or pace. In the trot, the horse's legs move in diagonal pairs; when the right foreleg moves forward, so does the left hind leg, and vice versa. In the pace each foreleg moves in unison with the hind leg on the same side. However, the breed is able to perform other horse gaits, including the canter, though this gait is penalized in harness racing.

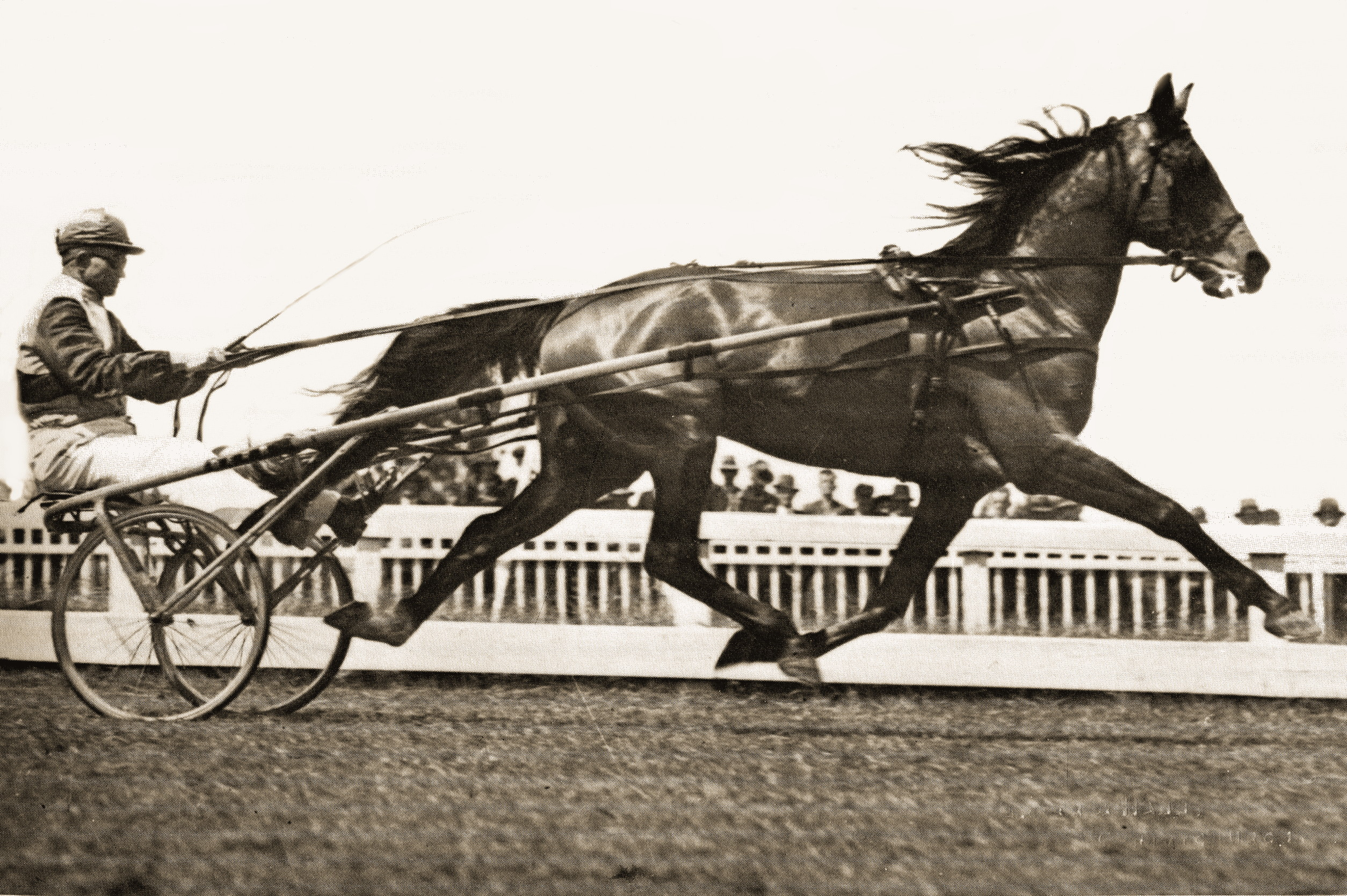
A racing pacer

Pacers still retain the ability to trot and do so regularly; however, they are labeled by the gait they race at. Additionally, some trotters are able to pace, but prefer to race at the trot. Today's Standardbreds race in the same gait for their whole career, with rare exception. And although the gaits are similar, the pace is faster than the trot.

Today's Standardbreds are commonly bred trotters to trotters, and pacers to pacers. Although it is possible for trotters to produce a pacer, these gait-specific breeding practices are causing Standardbreds to differentiate into two subpopulations based on gait, more distinct than some breeds.

The ability to pace is linked to a single-point mutation in gene DMRT3, which is expressed in the I6 subdivision of spinal cord neurons; this area is responsible for coordinating the locomotor network controlling limb movements. The point mutation causes early termination of the gene by coding for a stop codon, thus altering the function of this transcription factor. Uniquely, both pacing and trotting American Standardbreds are fixed for the DMRT3 variant. This suggests that there is at least one additional genetic variant that controls trotting and pacing in Standardbreds. However, European Standardbreds are not yet fixed for this DMRT3 variant, although homozygous individuals have better performance records.

=== Orthopedic diseases ===
Osteochondrosis (OC), osteochondrosis dissecans (OCD), and other related developmental orthopedic diseases (DOD) appear at a high frequency in Standardbreds. OC/OCD is a moderate to highly heritable condition in Standardbreds and similar breeds, and genetic risk factors have been identified. These findings suggest that a change in breeding practices could lower the prevalence within the breed; however, lesions may resolve on their own or can be surgically corrected.

== Breed history ==
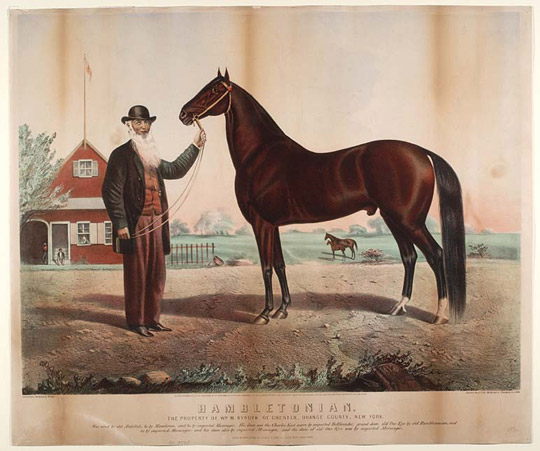
Hambletonian 10

In the 17th century, the first trotting races were held in the Americas, usually in fields on horses under saddle. However, by the mid-18th century, trotting races were held on official courses, with the horses in harness. Breeds that have contributed foundation stock to the Standardbred breed included the Narragansett Pacer, Canadian Pacer, Thoroughbred, Norfolk Trotter, Hackney, and Morgan.

The foundation bloodlines of the Standardbred trace to a Thoroughbred foaled in England in 1780 named Messenger. He was a gray stallion imported to the United States in 1788. He sired a number of flat racing horses, but was best known for his great-grandson, Hambletonian 10, also known as Rysdyk's Hambletonian, foaled in 1849 and considered the foundation sire of the breed and from whom most Standardbreds descend. Hambletonian 10 was out of a dam with Norfolk Trotter breeding, and the mare and foal were purchased by William Rysdyk, a farm hand from New York state, who successfully raced the colt as a three-year-old against other horses. The horse went on to sire 1,331 offspring, 40 of whom trotted a mile in under 2 minutes 30 seconds.

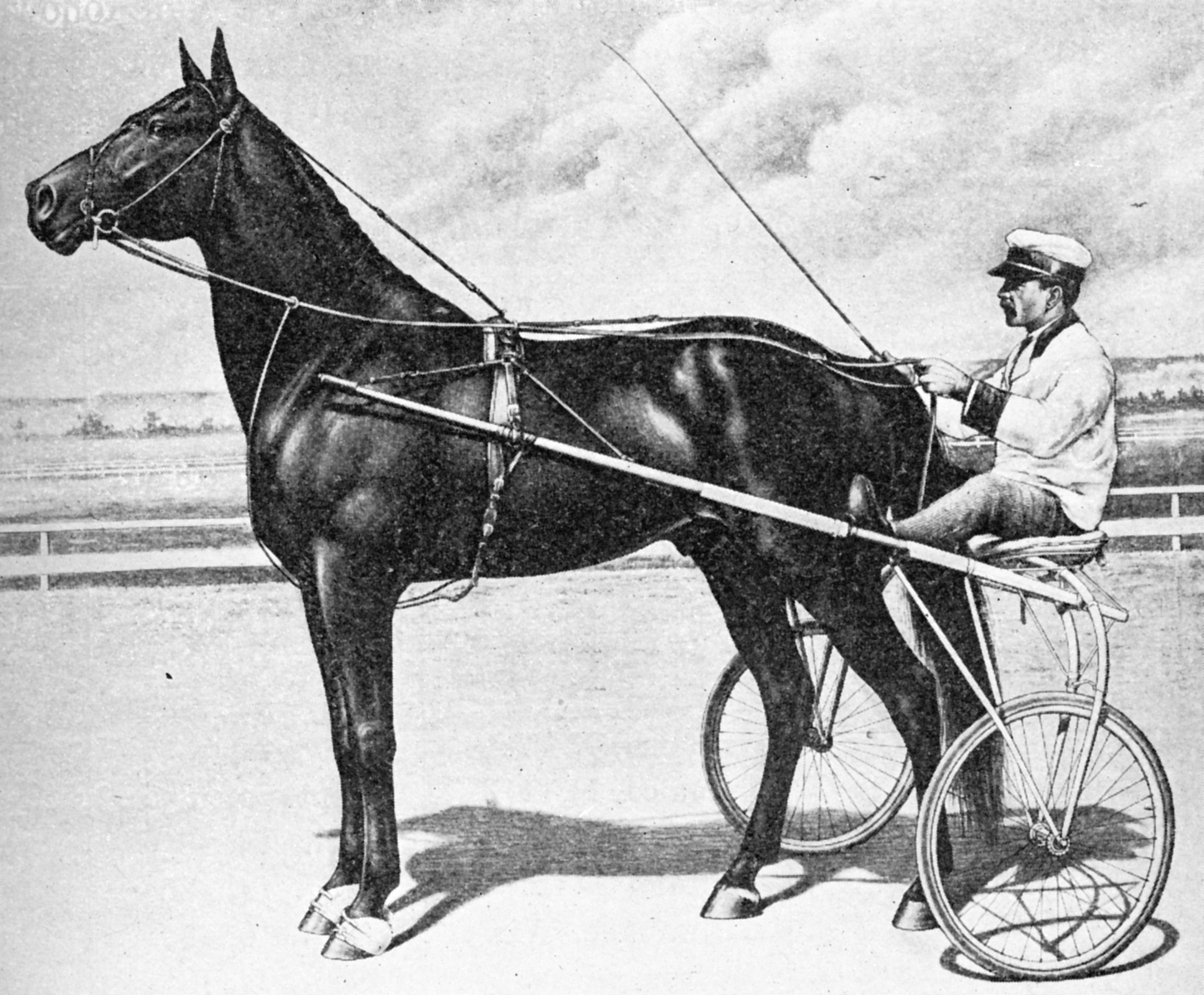
Dan Patch, a significant Standardbred pacing sire, c. 1900

Another influential sire was the Thoroughbred Diomed, born in 1777. Diomed's Thoroughbred grandson American Star, foaled in 1822, was influential in the development of the breed through the mares of his progeny by American Star 14 being bred to Hambletonian 10. When the sport started to gain popularity, more selective breeding was done to produce the faster harness trotter.

The first national Standardbred breed registry was formed in United States in 1879 by the National Association of Trotting Horse Breeders. The name arose due to the "standard" required of breeding stock, to be able to trot or pace a mile within a certain time limit. Every Standardbred had to be able to trot a mile in less than two minutes and 30 seconds. Today, many Standardbreds are faster than this original standard, with several pacing the mile within 1 min, 50 sec, and trotters only a few seconds slower than pacers. Slightly different bloodlines are found in trotters than in pacers, though both can trace their heritage back to Hambletonian 10.

At the foundation of the United States Trotting Association in 1939, a closed stud book was proposed. The studbook was not officially closed until 1973, however, it is likely that it was effectively closed prior. In 2009, in an effort to reduce the loss of genetic diversity within the breed, the United States Trotting Association capped the studbook for all new sires to 140 mares per year. This went into effect immediately for trotting stallions, and gradually for pacing stallions.

== Uses ==
Standardbreds are primarily used for driving and most start their lives headed to the race track.

=== Harness racing ===
Standardbreds are known for their skill in harness racing, being the fastest trotting horses in the world. Because of their speed, Standardbreds are often used to upgrade other breeds of harness racers around the world, such as the Orlov Trotter and French Trotter. In Australia, Canada, New Zealand, the United Kingdom, and the United States, races are held for both trotters and pacers. In continental Europe, all harness races are for trotters only. In 1968, New Zealand-bred Cardigan Bay became the first Standardbred horse ever to win US$1 million, and the ninth horse to do so worldwide—the first eight were Thoroughbreds.

=== Post-racing careers ===
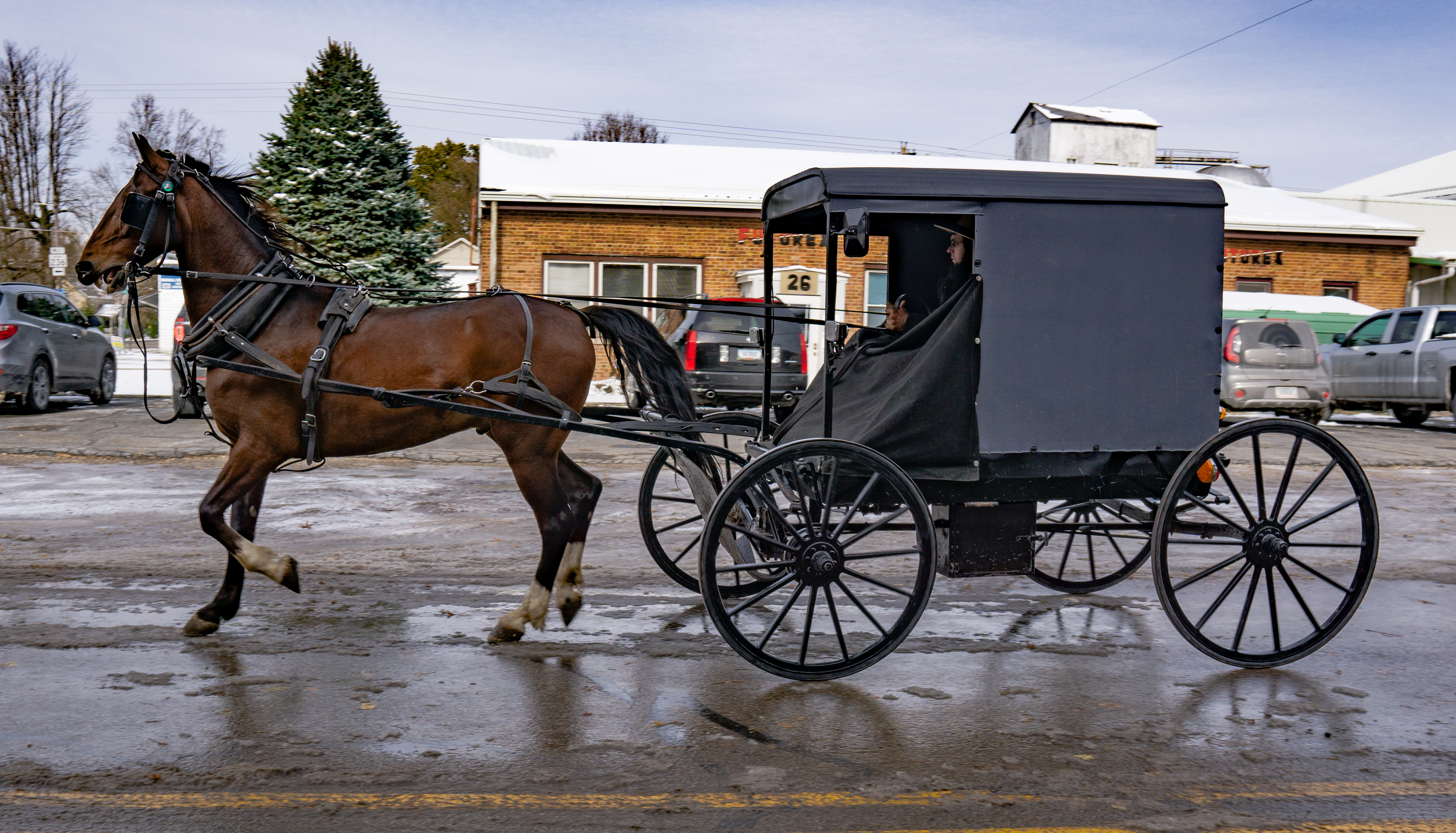
Standardbred pulling an Amish buggy

The Amish have been purchasing off-the-track Standardbreds for a long time, and almost all Amish horses were first trained in the racing industry. A horse may have become too slow for racing, but it is not too slow for pulling a buggy. Standardbreds have an easy-going nature and readily take to such an environment. By purchasing ex-racehorses, the Amish don't need to have breeding programs or raise young horses—there is a ready supply of mature and trained horses.

There are other organizations, such as the Standardbred Pleasure Horse Organization, working to find new homes and uses for retired racing Standardbreds. However, in order to make a good riding horse, some of the harness race training must be undone. For example, getting a Standardbred to canter might be difficult since they have been rebuked for cantering for years.
