= Osteochondropathy =

- Specialty: Rheumatology

Osteochondropathy refers to a disease ("-pathy") of the bone and cartilage.

However, it is more common to refer to these conditions as one of the following:

- chondropathy (disease of the cartilage)
- A bone disease is also called an "osteopathy", but because the term osteopathy is often used to describe a healthcare approach, use of the term can cause some confusion.

== See also ==
- Osteochondrosis
- Osteochondritis
