= List of childhood diseases and disorders =

Disability-adjusted life year for childhood-cluster diseases per 100,000 inhabitants. These include pertussis, poliomyelitis, diphtheria, measles, and tetanus. no data ≤ 25 25-50 50-100 100-200 200-300 300-400 400-500 500-750 750-1000 1000-2000 2000-3000 ≥ 3000

The term childhood disease refers to disease that is contracted or becomes symptomatic before the legal age of majority. Many of these diseases can also be contracted by adults.

Some childhood diseases include:

== Diseases of neonates and children younger than five years ==
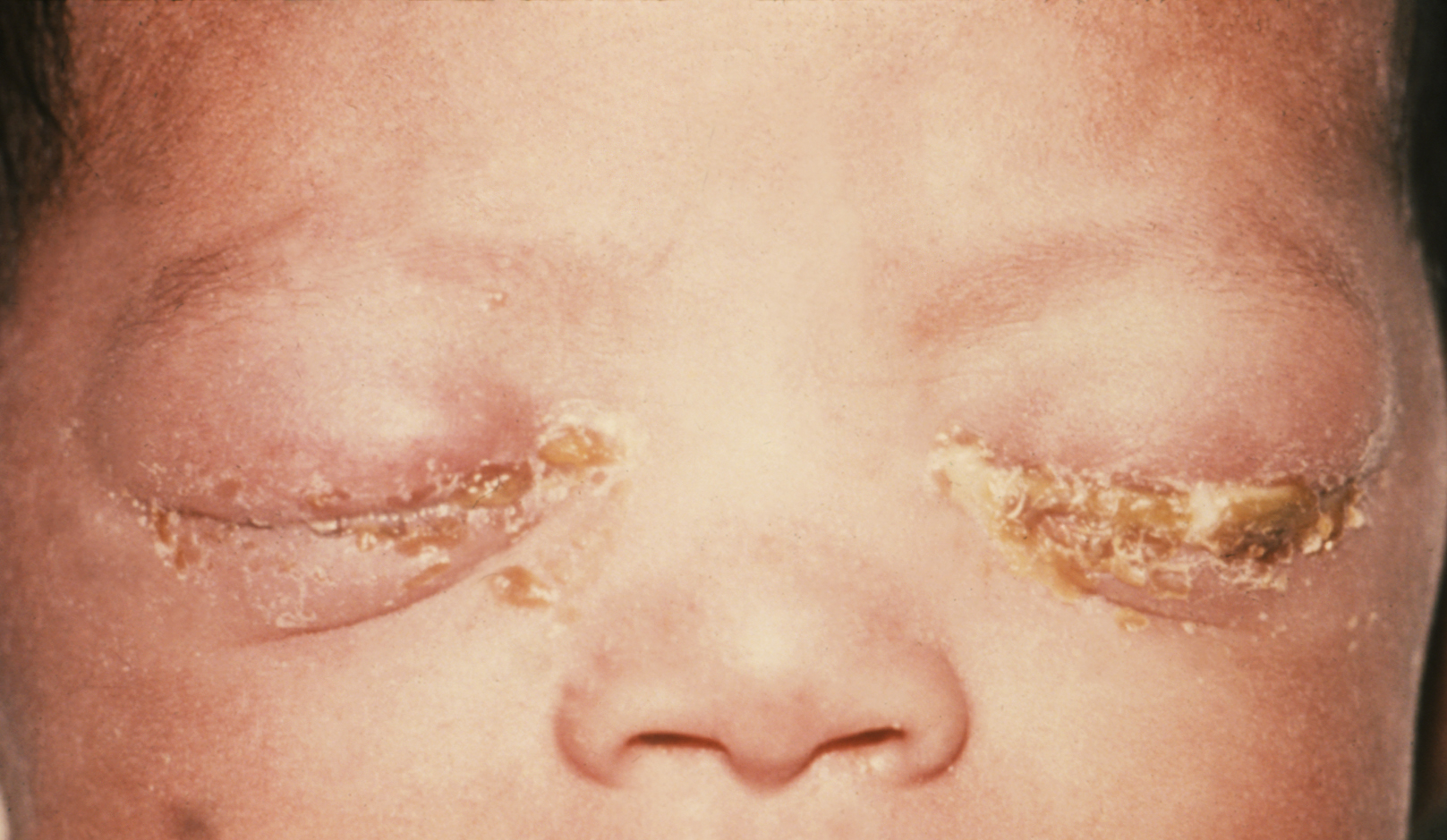
Gonococcal ophthalmia neonatorum

- Candida albicans infection
- Candida parapsilosis infection
- Cytomegalovirus infection
- Diphtheria
- Human coronavirus infection
- respiratory distress syndrome
- Measles
- Meconium aspiration syndrome
- Metapneumovirus (hMPV) infection
- Necrotizing enterocolitis
- Neonatal conjunctivitis
- Parainfluenza (PIV) infection
- Pertussis
- Poliomyelitis
- prenatal Listeria
- Group B streptoccus infection
- Tay–Sachs disease
- Tetanus
- Ureaplasma urealyticum infection
- Respiratory syncytial virus infection
- Rhinovirus; common cold

== Diseases of older children ==
- Common cold
- AIDS
- Anemia
- Asthma
- Bronchiolitis
- Cancer
- Candidiasis ("Thrush")
- Chagas disease
- Chickenpox
- Copenhagen disease
- Croup
- Cystic fibrosis
- Cytomegalovirus (the virus most frequently transmitted before birth)
- Dental caries
- Type 1 diabetes
- Diphtheria
- Duchenne muscular dystrophy
- Fifth disease
- Congenital Heart Disease
- Infectious mononucleosis
- Influenza
- Intussusception (medical disorder)
- Juvenile idiopathic arthritis
- Leukemia
- Measles
- Meningitis
- Molluscum contagiosum
- Mumps
- Nephrotic syndrome
- Osgood-Schlatter disease
- Osteogenesis Imperfecta (OI)
- Pneumonia
- Polio
- Rheumatic fever
- Rickets
- Roseola
- Rubella
- Sever's disease
- Tetanus
- Tuberculosis
- Volvulus
- Whooping cough
- Hepatitis A
- Scarlet fever (Scarletina)
- Lyme disease
- Xerophthalmia

=== See also ===
- The Pediatric Foundation for Rare Diseases
