= Osteochondritis =

- Specialty: Orthopedics

Osteochondritis is a painful type of osteochondrosis where the cartilage or bone in a joint is inflamed.

It often refers to osteochondritis dissecans (OCD). The term dissecans refers to the "creation of a flap of cartilage that further dissects away from its underlying subchondral attachments (dissecans)".

The other recognized types of osteochondritis are osteochondritis deformans juvenilis (osteochondritis of the capitular head of the epiphysis of the femur) and osteochondritis deformans juvenilis dorsi (osteochondrosis of the spinal vertebrae, also known as Scheuermann's disease).

Osteochondritis, and especially osteochondritis dissecans, can manifest in animals as a primary cause of elbow dysplasia, a chronic condition in some dog breeds.
