= Sinding-Larsen and Johansson syndrome =

- Other names: Aseptic necrosis of patella
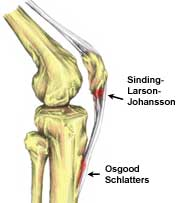
- The site of the OSG and SLJ on the knee: OSG at tibial tuberosity and SLJ at inferior pole of patella

Sinding-Larsen and Johansson syndrome, named after Swedish surgeon Sven Christian Johansson (1880-1959), and Christian Magnus Falsen Sinding-Larsen (1866-1930), a Norwegian physician, is apophysitis of the inferior pole of the patella. It is analogous to Osgood–Schlatter disease which involves the upper margin of the tibia. This variant was discovered in 1908, during a winter indoor Olympic qualifier event in Scandinavia. Sever's disease is a similar condition affecting the heel.

This condition called Sinding-Larsen and Johansson syndrome was described independently by Sinding-Larsen in 1921 and Johansson in 1922.

== Signs and symptoms ==
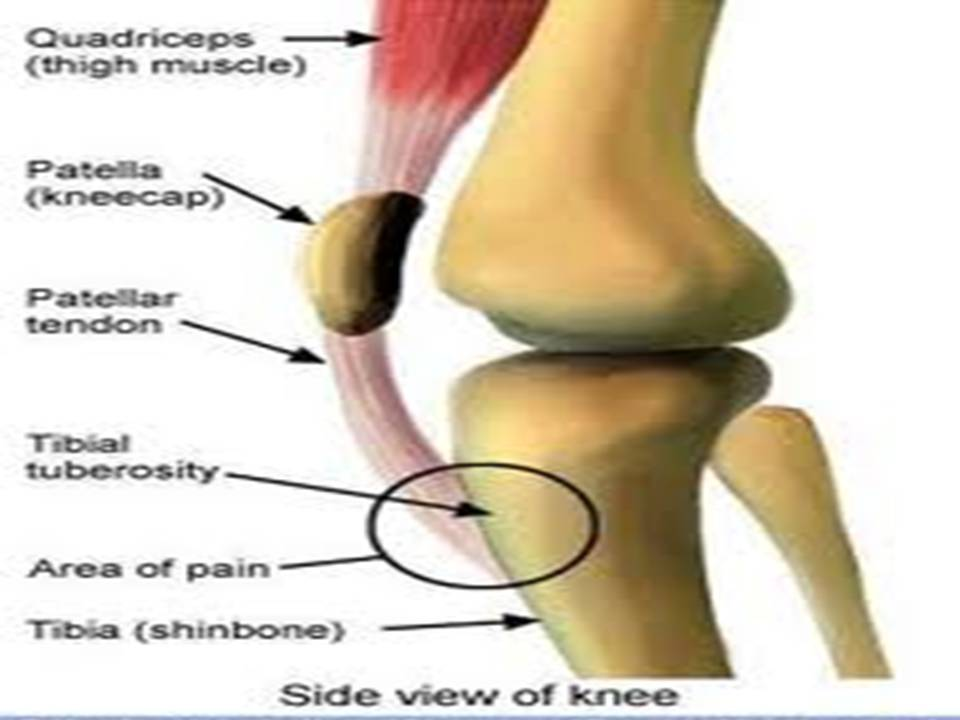
Patella, its tendon and tibial tuberosity

The condition is usually seen in athletic individuals typically between 10 and 14 years of age. Following a strain or partial rupture of patellar ligament the patient develops a traction ‘tendinitis’ characterized by pain and point tenderness at the inferior (lower) pole of the patella associated with focal swelling.

Children with cerebral palsy are particularly prone to SLJ.

== Diagnosis ==
While standard anteroposterior and lateral radiographs may demonstrate fragmentation or irregularity at the inferior patellar pole, findings can often be subtle or even normal in early stages. Magnetic resonance imaging (MRI) is the most valuable diagnostic tool, revealing bone marrow edema and signal changes at the patellar tendon insertion, confirming inflammation and ruling out alternative diagnoses such as patellar sleeve avulsion fracture or osteochondritis dissecans.

== Treatment ==
The cornerstone of treatment for SLJS is conservative management, including rest, activity modification, cryotherapy, and nonsteroidal anti-inflammatory medications. Stretching and strengthening of the quadriceps and hamstrings are also beneficial. In most cases, symptoms resolve within a few months with adequate rest. Gradual return-to-play programs are essential to prevent recurrence
