= Freiberg disease =

- Other names: Freiberg infraction
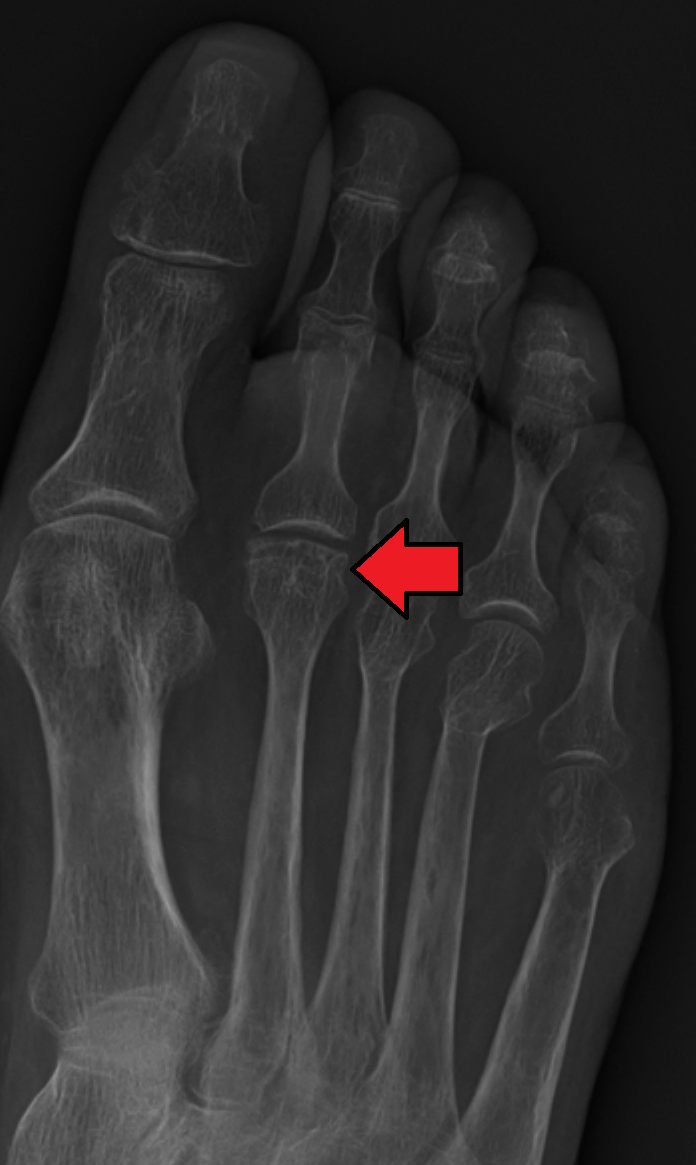
- Freiberg disease as seen on plain film
- Specialty: Orthopedics

Freiberg disease, also known as a Freiberg infraction, is a form of avascular necrosis in the metatarsal bone of the foot. It generally develops in the second metatarsal, but can occur in any metatarsal. Physical stress causes multiple tiny fractures where the middle of the metatarsal meets the growth plate. These fractures impair blood flow to the end of the metatarsal resulting in the death of bone cells (osteonecrosis). It is an uncommon condition, occurring most often in young women, athletes, and those with abnormally long metatarsals. Approximately 80% of those diagnosed are women.

Initial treatment is generally 4–6 weeks of limited activity, often with crutches or orthotics. In rare cases, surgery is necessary to reduce the bone mass of the metatarsal.

The condition was first described by Albert H. Freiberg in 1914. He initially thought the condition was caused by acute physical trauma, which is why it was initially called an infraction.

Freiberg disease is a rare condition that affects the second metatarsal head, leading to pain and potential deformity. It is often associated with activities that place stress on the forefoot, such as running or jumping. Its prevalence is not well-documented, but it is believed to be more common in females than males.

== Signs and symptoms ==
Symptoms vary in severity and progression:

Symptom	Description
Pain	Localized pain in the forefoot, particularly during weight-bearing activities. The pain is often described as sharp or aching and may worsen with prolonged standing or walking.
Swelling	Edema around the affected metatarsal head, which can be visible and palpable. The swelling may fluctuate but is generally persistent.
Stiffness	Reduced range of motion in the metatarsophalangeal joint, leading to difficulty in flexing or extending the affected toe.
Limping	Altered gait to avoid pain during walking, often characterized by a tendency to bear weight on the lateral aspect of the foot.
Callus formation	Thickening of the skin beneath the affected metatarsal head, which can develop as a result of altered weight-bearing patterns.

In addition to these primary symptoms, patients may experience:

- Clicking or popping sensations in the joint, particularly during movement
- Numbness or tingling in the affected toe, possibly due to nerve irritation
- Difficulty wearing certain types of footwear, especially those with high heels or narrow toe boxes
- Increased pain and stiffness after periods of inactivity, such as upon waking in the morning
- Occasional episodes of joint locking or catching

The severity of symptoms can vary widely among individuals and may progress over time if left untreated.

== Causes ==
While the exact cause remains unclear, several factors have been identified as potential contributors:

1. Anatomical variations: Differences in metatarsal length or shape may predispose individuals to the condition. A relatively long second metatarsal, for example, may be subject to increased mechanical stress.
2. Hormonal influences: The higher prevalence in females, particularly during adolescence, suggests a possible hormonal component. Estrogen fluctuations may affect bone metabolism and susceptibility to stress injuries.
3. Genetic predisposition: Some studies indicate a potential genetic susceptibility to Freiberg disease, although specific genetic markers have not yet been identified.
4. Occupational factors: Activities involving repetitive stress on the forefoot, such as ballet dancing, running, or sports that require sudden stops and starts, may increase the risk of developing Freiberg disease.
5. Footwear: Ill-fitting shoes or high heels that place excessive pressure on the metatarsal heads may contribute to the development of the condition. Shoes with inadequate support or cushioning can also exacerbate existing symptoms.
6. Trauma: Acute injuries to the metatarsal, such as fractures or severe sprains, may trigger the onset of Freiberg disease in some cases.
7. Systemic conditions: Certain systemic disorders that affect bone metabolism or vascular health, such as diabetes or autoimmune diseases, may potentially increase the risk of developing Freiberg disease.

Understanding these contributing factors is crucial for both prevention and management of Freiberg disease, as it allows for targeted interventions and lifestyle modifications.

== Pathophysiology ==
The pathophysiology of Freiberg disease involves a complex interplay of vascular, mechanical, and traumatic factors. The process typically begins with a disruption of blood supply to the metatarsal head, leading to avascular necrosis of the bone tissue. As the affected bone loses its structural integrity, it begins to collapse under weight-bearing stress. This collapse is often progressive and can lead to significant deformity of the metatarsal head. Concurrent with bone changes, the articular cartilage covering the metatarsal head deteriorates, resulting in joint surface irregularities. These changes can further exacerbate pain and limit joint function. The body's attempt to repair the damaged area leads to an inflammatory response, which contributes to ongoing tissue damage and may play a role in the chronic nature of the condition. Several theories attempt to explain the underlying mechanisms of Freiberg disease:

1. Traumatic theory: This theory suggests that repetitive microtrauma or acute injury to the metatarsal head may initiate the disease process. Activities that place excessive stress on the forefoot, such as running or dancing, could contribute to this mechanism.
2. Vascular theory: This hypothesis proposes that disruption of blood supply to the metatarsal head, possibly due to anatomical variations or microvascular damage, leads to bone necrosis. The second metatarsal, being the longest, may be particularly susceptible to vascular compromise.
3. Biomechanical theory: This theory posits that abnormal foot mechanics or excessive loading on the affected metatarsal contribute to the development of the condition. Factors such as a long second metatarsal or hypermobility of the first ray may predispose individuals to Freiberg disease.

Recent research has also explored the potential role of genetic factors and hormonal influences in the development of Freiberg disease, suggesting a multifactorial etiology.

== Diagnosis ==
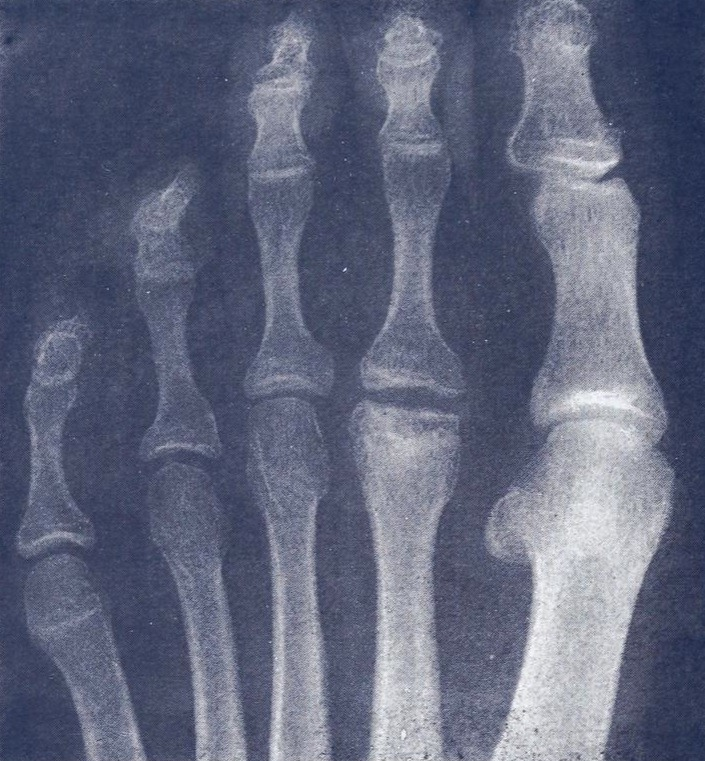
X-ray of Freiberg disease

Accurate diagnosis typically involves a combination of examination and imaging:

1. Physical examination: Assessment of pain, swelling, and range of motion in the affected foot.
2. Radiography: X-rays may reveal flattening, sclerosis, or fragmentation of the metatarsal head.
3. Magnetic resonance imaging (MRI): Provides detailed images of soft tissue and bone changes, particularly useful in early stages of the disease.
4. Bone scans: May help identify areas of increased bone activity associated with the condition.
5. Computed tomography (CT): While less commonly used, CT scans can provide detailed information about bone structure and may be helpful in surgical planning.

Differential diagnosis is important, as several conditions can mimic Freiberg disease, including stress fractures of the metatarsal, Morton's neuroma, and various forms of arthritis.

== Treatment ==
Treatment for Freiberg disease varies depending on the stage of the disease and the severity of symptoms. Options include:

- Rest and activity modification: Reducing activities that exacerbate pain can help alleviate symptoms.
- Pain relief: Over-the-counter pain medications, such as ibuprofen or acetaminophen, can be used to manage discomfort.
- Orthotics: Custom shoe inserts may help redistribute pressure on the foot and improve alignment.
- Physical therapy: Exercises to strengthen the foot and improve flexibility can be beneficial.

=== Surgery ===
If nonoperative treatments are ineffective after several months, surgical options may be considered, including:

- Debridement: Removal of damaged tissue and bone to relieve pain and improve function.
- Osteotomy: Surgical realignment of the metatarsal to relieve pressure on the affected joint.
- Arthroplasty: Joint replacement or reconstruction may be necessary in advanced cases.

== Prognosis ==
The prognosis for Freiberg disease varies depending on the stage at diagnosis and the chosen treatment approach. Early diagnosis and appropriate management can lead to favorable outcomes, with many patients experiencing significant pain relief and improved function. However, some individuals may develop chronic pain or limitations in physical activities, particularly if the condition is left untreated or progresses to advanced stages.

== Epidemiology ==
Freiberg disease is relatively rare, but it is more commonly diagnosed in young females, particularly those involved in sports or activities that place repetitive stress on the forefoot. The condition typically presents during adolescence or early adulthood, with a peak incidence in individuals aged 10 to 20 years. While the exact prevalence is not well-documented, it is recognized as a significant cause of forefoot pain in this demographic.
