= Tubercle (bone) =

Part of bone

In the skeleton of humans and other animals, tubercles and tuberosities (from Latin tuber ‘bump, protuberance’) are protrusions or eminences that serve as attachments for tendons or ligaments. The enthesis is the connective tissue between the tendon of a skeletal muscle and bone. Tuberosities (for example the ischial tuberosity of the pelvis) are generally larger and less rounded than tubercles (for example the greater and lesser tubercles of the proximal humerus).

Apophyses, like epiphyses, are regions of bones where ossification occurs throughout chilhood (secondary centres of ossification), but unlike epiphyses they are not adjacent to joint surfaces. When ossification is complete, they may become trochanters, tubercles and tuberosities depending on their physical dimensions and location.

== Main tubercles ==
=== Humerus ===
The humerus has two tubercles, the greater tubercle and the lesser tubercle. These are situated at the proximal end of the bone, that is the end that connects with the scapula. The greater/lesser tubercule is located from the top of the acromion laterally and inferiorly.

=== Radius ===
The radius has two, the radial tuberosity and Lister's tubercle.

=== Ribs ===
On a rib, tubercle is an eminence on the back surface, at the junction between the neck and the body of the rib. It consists of an articular and a non-articular area. The lower and more medial articular area is a small oval surface for articulation with the transverse process of the lower of the two vertebrae which gives attachment to the head. The higher, non-articular area is a rough elevation which gives attachment to the ligament of the tubercle. The tubercle is much more prominent in the upper ribs than in the lower ribs.

=== Tibia ===
The most prominent tubercle of the tibia, a leg bone which is more commonly known as the shinbone or shankbone, is the tibial tuberosity. The tibial tuberosity is located on the tibia's anterior surface, distal to the medial condyle. It creates a bony prominence just below the patella, and can be easily located with the fingers. It creates an attachment point for the ligamentum patellae, or patellar ligament. Other tubercles of the tibia include the medial intercondylar tubercle, the lateral intercondylar tubercle, and Gerdy's tubercle.

=== Femur ===
A trochanter is one of up to three tubercles of the femur:

- Greater trochanter
- Lesser trochanter
- Third trochanter, which is occasionally present

=== Fifth metatarsal ===
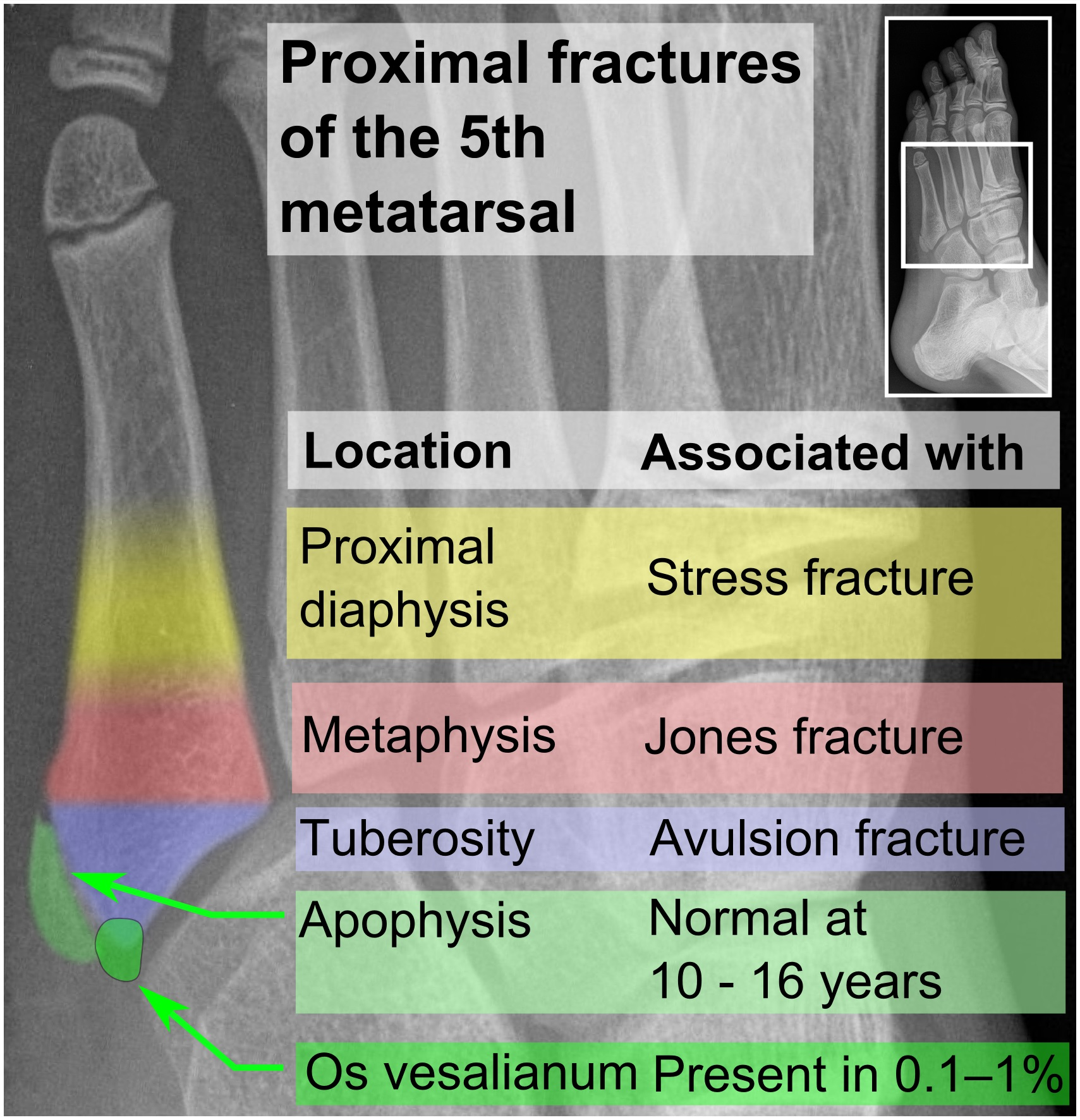
Proximal fractures of the fifth metatarsal bone: Proximal diaphysis, typically stress fracture.; Metaphysis: Jones fracture; -Tuberosity: Pseudo-Jones fracture (avulsion fracture). Normal anatomy: Apophysis: Normal at 10 - 16 years.; Os vesalianum, an accessory bone.

In the fifth metatarsal bone, the most proximal part of the bone is termed the "tuberosity", and the secondary ossification center that is normally present thereon in children is termed the "apophysis".

== Related diseases and conditions ==
=== Fractures ===
The main type of fracture affecting tubercles is avulsion fracture, by pulling the attached tendon.

=== Apophysitis ===
Apophysitis is inflammation of an apophysis before it has fully ossified to become a tubercle in later childhood. As such, it affects growing children, following repetitive traction of the ligament that attaches to the apophysis. Examples include:

- Osgood–Schlatter disease (apophysitis of the tibial tubercle)
- Sever's disease (apophysitis of the posterior tubercle of the heel)
- Sinding-Larsen and Johansson syndrome (apophysitis of the inferior pole of the patella)

=== Enthesitis ===
Enthesitis is an anatomically close but separate condition, wherein there is inflammation of the entheses, the sites where tendons or ligaments insert into the bone. It is associated with HLA B27 arthropathies such as ankylosing spondylitis, psoriatic arthritis, and reactive arthritis.
