= Sever's disease =

Calcaneal apophysitis (Sever's disease)
- Other names: Calcaneus apophysitis, Severs
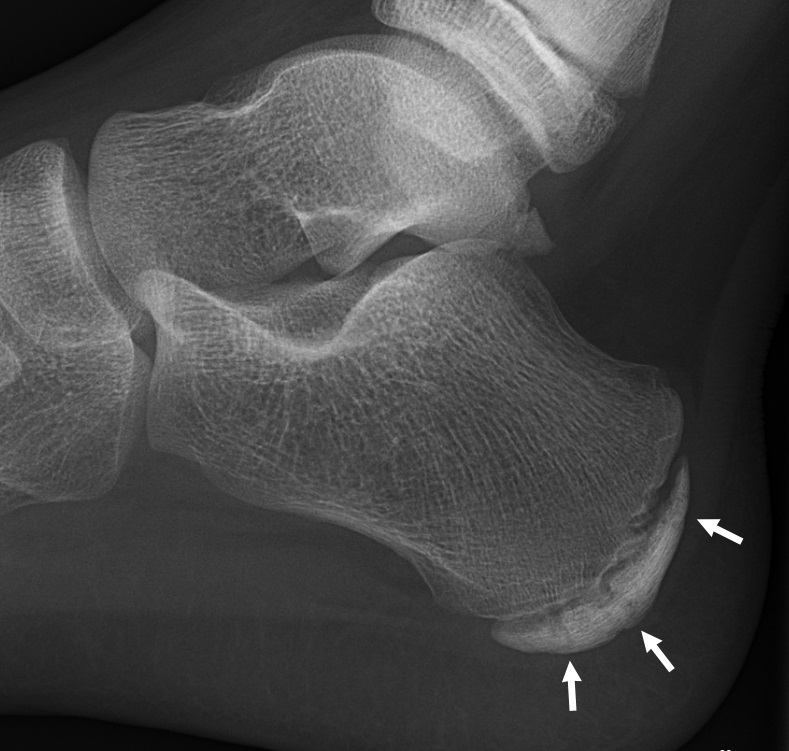
- X-ray of the foot of an 11-year-old child, showing sclerosis and fragmentation of the calcaneal apophysis. This is a sign of low sensitivity and specificity of Sever's disease, because those with Sever's disease may not have it, and this appearance is also present in feet without pain.
- Specialty: Rheumatology
- Symptoms: Heel pain

Sever's disease, also known as calcaneal apophysitis, is an inflammation at the back of the heel (or calcaneus) growth plate in growing children. The condition is thought to be caused by repetitive stress at the heel. This condition is benign and common and usually resolves when the growth plate has closed or during periods of less activity. It occurs in both males and females. There are a number of locations in the body that may get apophysitis pain. Another common location is at the front of the knee which is known as apophysitis of the tibial tuberosity or Osgood–Schlatter disease.

== Symptoms ==
Children with calcaneal apophysitis commonly complain of pain at the back of the heel. This pain increases with jumping and some running sports. Sometimes, the pain makes children limp and may result in poor sports performance or them not wanting to participate in some sports. The back of the heel is never swollen or red, unless there has been shoe rubbing. When the back of the heel is squeezed from the inside and outside, children with calcaneal apophysitis will report pain. Foot radiographs are not needed to diagnose calcaneal apophysitis as the growth plate can look similar with or without pain. Health professionals should only refer for imaging when the symptoms don't match with the usual presentation or there has been an injury that has resulted in heel pain. Therefore, the diagnosis of Sever's disease is primarily from history and physical assessment.

== Cause ==
There are no known causes of calcaneal apophysitis or any ways that it can be prevented. Instead there are things that may contribute to calcaneal apophysitis developing. Children who complain of this type of heel pain commonly are taller (may have just had a growth spurt) or heavier. They also often play sports that have higher jumping, running or direction changes like basketball or soccer. It can also occur more in children who play on hard surfaces. Sometimes children who also start a new sport also complain on this pain or it may happen at the start of a new season. Because calcaneal apophysitis also occurs around puberty, it is thought that it is related to rapid growth and perhaps muscle tightness, but this is not the case for all children. There have been reports that it may also be associated with foot posture (high arches or flat feet). But in large studies, children with calcaneal apophysitis had similar foot postures to children without pain. This means, while some children have high arches or flat feet, not all will get calcaneal apophysitis.

== Treatment ==
Parents can often use home treatments to resolve pain. Health professionals who also commonly treat this condition are podiatrists, physiotherapists, family medical doctors, paediatricians or orthopaedic surgeons. Treatment may consist of one or more of the following:

- Using ice on the area or an over the counter non-steroidal anti-inflammatory drug with the excecption of aspirin as it may cause the rare but potentially fatal Reye syndrome
- Load management including some sport substitution or lessening the amount, not playing for as long or having more frequent breaks.
- Heel raisers or heel cushions
- Foot orthotics
- If pain is present in some footwear more than others, consider changing footwear to increase support or cushioning
- Avoid being barefoot for long period of times while painful
- If doing a sport in barefoot, a heel cushion or taping may assist during the activity

== Recovery ==
Sever's disease is not a serious condition and many children get better without needing health professional care. If use of home treatments like putting ice on the heels or changing sport don't work, children should be assessed by a health professionals to personalise the treatment and make sure it really is calcaneal apophysitis. This condition does not have any long term foot or ankle problems.

While pain from calcaneal apophysitis can go away quickly, it often comes back from time to time. It can appear until children are 12–15 years old.

== Eponym ==
The correct term for this condition is calcaneal apophysitis. The term Sever's disease was coined after it was first described by James Warren Sever (1878–1964), an American orthopedic doctor, in 1912. Sever published The Principles of Orthopaedic Surgery in 1940 through the Macmillan Company. Sever described it as an apophyseal injury and given it is neither contagious nor progressive, the disease label is being used less with time.

== See also ==
- List of childhood diseases
