= Elbow dysplasia =

Medical condition in dogs

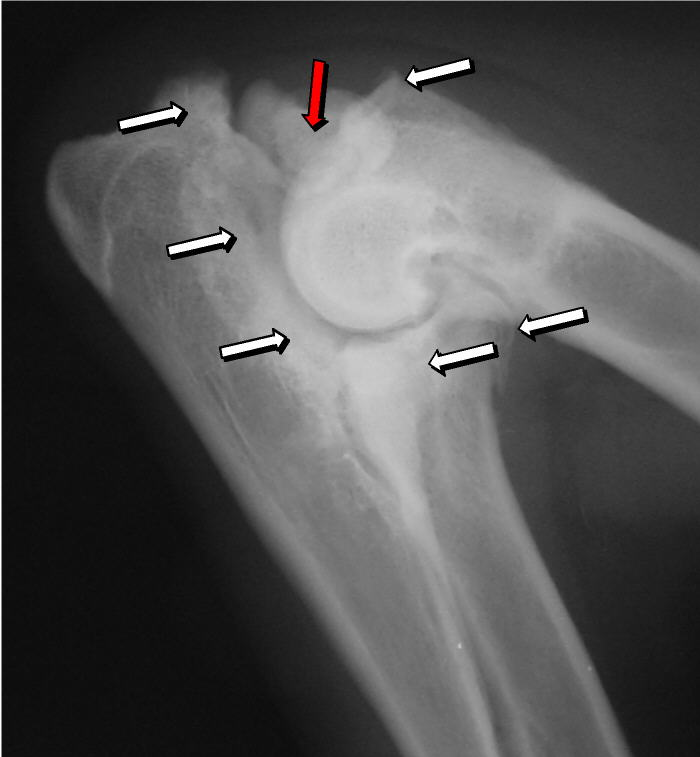
Ununited anconeal process

Elbow dysplasia is a condition involving multiple developmental abnormalities of the elbow-joint in the dog, specifically the growth of cartilage or the structures surrounding it. These abnormalities, known as 'primary lesions', give rise to osteoarthritic processes. Elbow dysplasia is a common condition of certain breeds of dogs.

Most primary lesions are related to osteochondrosis, a disease of the joint cartilage, and osteochondritis dissecans (OCD), the separation of a flap of cartilage on the joint surface. Other common causes of elbow dysplasia include an ununited anconeal process (UAP) and fragmented or ununited medial coronoid process (FCP or FMCP).

Osteochondritis dissecans is difficult to diagnose clinically as the animal may only exhibit an unusual gait. Consequently, OCD may be masked by, or misdiagnosed as, other skeletal and joint conditions such as hip dysplasia. The problem develops in puppyhood, although often is subclinical, and there may be pain or stiffness, discomfort on extension, or other compensating characteristics. Diagnosis generally depends on X-rays, arthroscopy, or MRI scans. While cases of OCD of the stifle go undetected and heal spontaneously, others are exhibited in acute lameness. Surgery is recommended once the animal has been deemed lame; otherwise, non-surgical control is usually used.

== The disease ==
Elbow dysplasia is a significant genetically determined problem in many breeds of dog, often manifesting from puppyhood and continuing for life. In elbow dysplasia, the complex elbow joint suffers from a structural defect, often related to its cartilage. This initial condition, known as a "primary lesion", causes an abnormal level of wear and tear and gradual degradation of the joint, at times disabling or with chronic pain. Secondary processes such as inflammation and osteoarthritis can arise from this damage which increase the problem and add further problems of their own.

== Causes ==
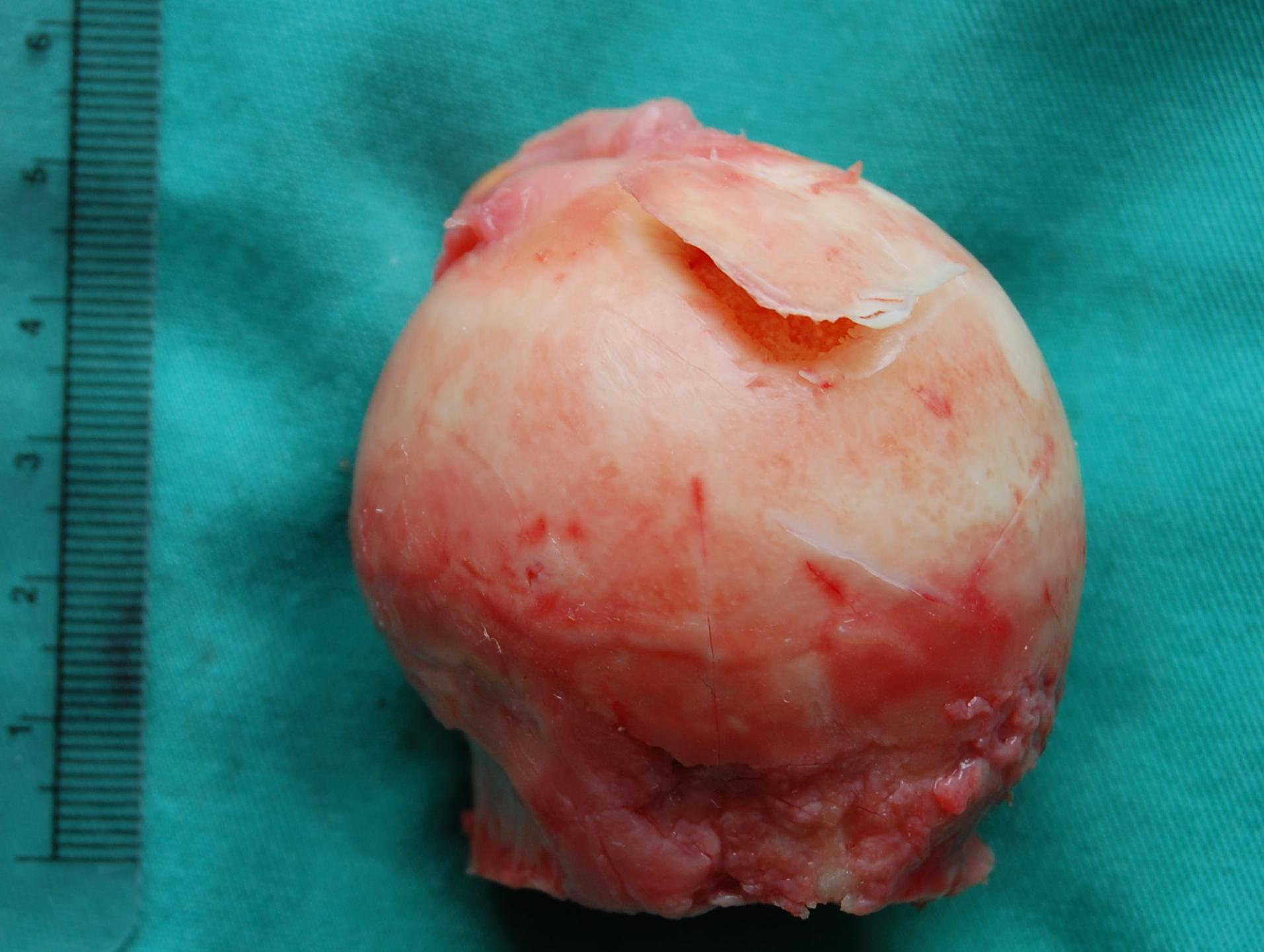
Human femur head showing a flap of cartilage (osteochondritis dissecans) due to avascular necrosis. Similar cartilage damage in dogs causes wear in the joint leading to osteoarthritic processes and is a common cause of elbow dysplasia.

The most common cause is osteochondrosis, which is a disease of the joint cartilage, and osteochondritis dissecans (OCD or OD), the separation of a flap of cartilage from the joint surface as a result of avascular necrosis, which in turn arises from failed blood flow in the subchondral bone.

In OCD, the normal change of cartilage to bone in the development of the joint fails or is delayed. The cartilage continues to grow and may split or become necrotic. The cause is uncertain, but possibly includes genetics, trauma, and nutrition (including excessive calcium and decreased vitamin C intake). OCD lesions found in the elbow at the medial epicondyle of the humerus are caused by disturbed endochondral fusion of the epiphysis of the medial epicondyle with the distal end of the humerus, which may in turn be caused by avulsion of the epiphysis. Specific conditions related to OCD include fragmentation of the medial coronoid process of the ulna (FMCP) and an ununited anconeal process of the ulna (UAP). All types of OCD of the elbow are most typically found in large breed dogs, with symptoms starting between the ages of 4 and 8 months. Males are affected twice as often as females. The disease often affects both elbows (30 to 70 percent of the time), and symptoms include intermittent lameness, joint swelling, and external rotation and abduction of the paw. Osteoarthritis will develop later in most cases.

UAP is caused by a separation from the ulna of the ossification center of the anconeal process. In some large breeds, including the German Shepherd, the anconeal process has its own secondary ossification center, which should fuse by about 5–6 months of age; UAP results when this fusion fails. FMCP is caused by a failure of the coronoid process to unite with the ulna.

== Diagnosis and treatment ==
Diagnosis is through x-rays, arthroscopy or CT (computed tomography). In cases with significant lameness, surgery is the best option, especially with UAP. However, conservative treatment is often enough for cases of FMCP and OCD of the medial humeral epicondyle. The dogs are exercised regularly and given pain medication, and between the ages of 12 and 18 months the lameness will often improve or disappear. Control of body weight is important in all cases of elbow dysplasia, and prevention of quick growth spurts in puppies may help to prevent the disease.

Surgery for FMCP consists of removal of cartilage and bone fragments and correction of any incongruity of the joint. Reattachment of UAP with a screw is usually attempted before the age of 24 weeks, and after that age the typical treatment is removal of the UAP. Without surgery, UAP rapidly progresses to osteoarthritis, but with FMCP osteoarthritis typically occurs with or without surgery. Osteoarthritis is also a common sequela of OCD of the humerus despite medical or surgical treatment. Elbow replacement surgery has been developed and can be an option for treatment.

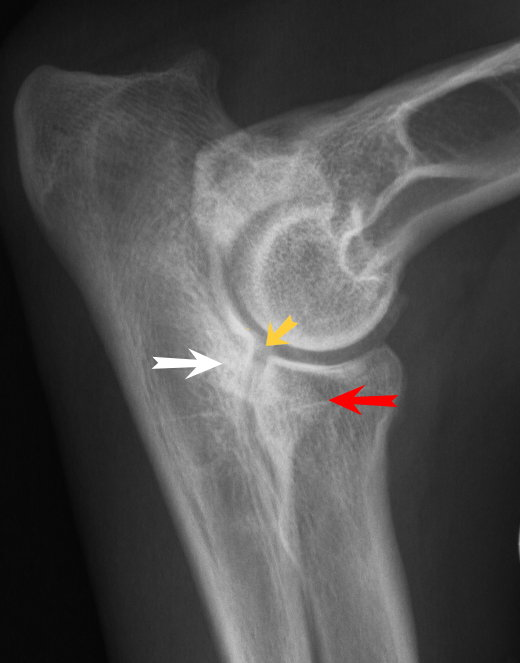
Fragmentation of the medial coronoid process

=== Non-surgical treatment ===
Conservative therapies include NSAIDs, pain medication, weight management and exercise restrictions.

=== Total elbow replacement ===
The elbow is a complex joint, bears 60% of body load, and tolerates problems less well than the hips. As a result, elbow replacement is more complex than hip replacement, rehabilitation can take significantly longer, and some degree of lameness will remain. The surgery is classified as of 2010 as a "salvage" operation - that is, a last resort for an otherwise viable animal. Success rates of around 80 - 85% (approximately 5 in 6) were being discussed by sources in 2005 and again in 2008.

There are also fewer options if the replacement fails; arthrodesis (surgical fusion of the joint) can result in a pain-free but lame gait. However, arthrodesis is itself a complex surgery with a long recovery time, and if arthrodesis is required, additional strain will be borne by other nearby joints, so other leg and shoulder conditions such as osteoarthritis may become more significant.

== Grading for breeding purposes ==
The Orthopedic Foundation for Animals in the United States will grade elbow X-rays of dogs intended for breeding.
