= Osteochondritis dissecans =

Ischemic bone disease

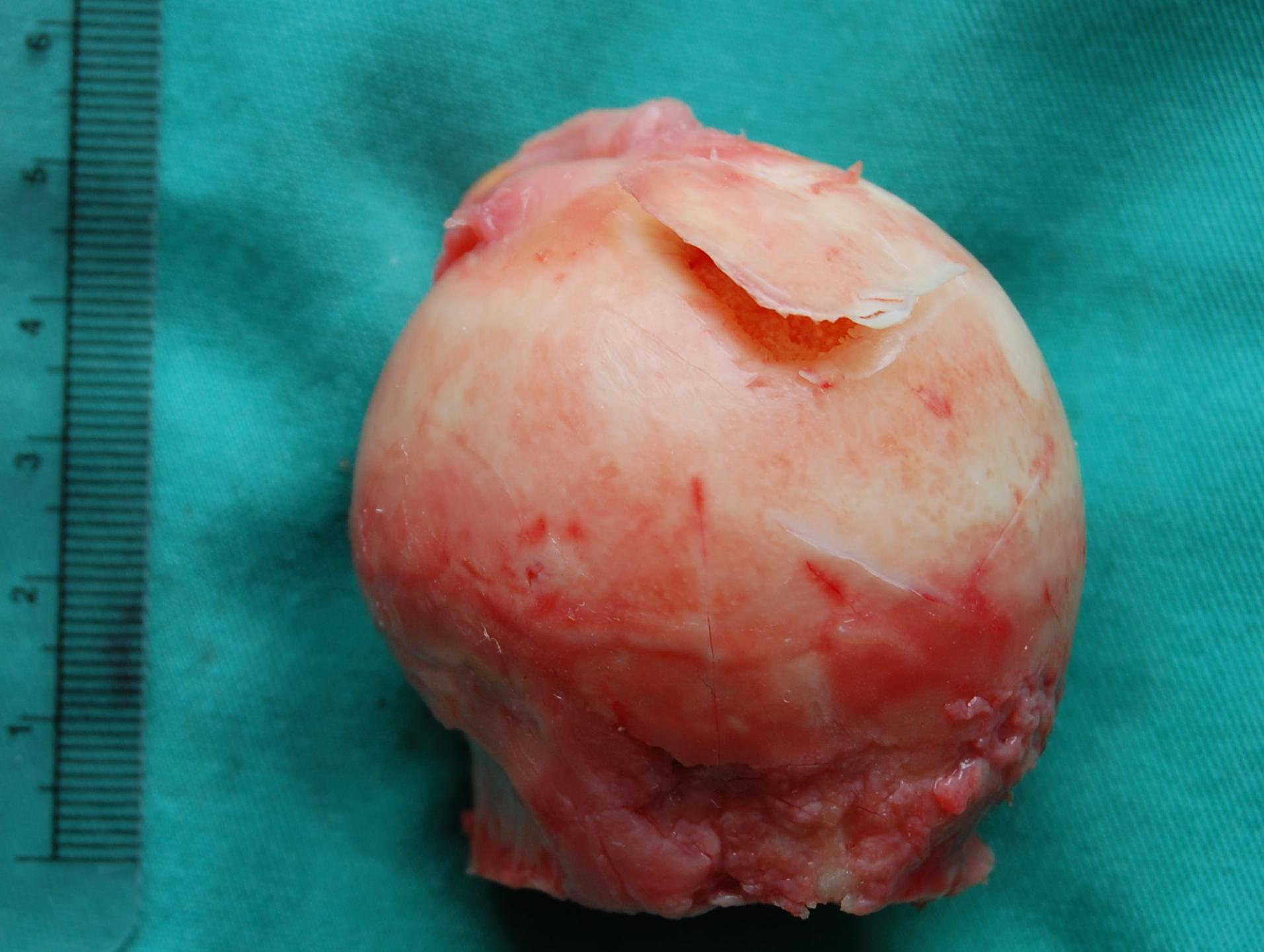
- A large flap lesion in the femur head typical of late stage Osteochondritis dissecans. In this case, the lesion was caused by avascular necrosis of the bone just under the cartilage.
- Pronunciation: /ˌɒsti.oʊkɒnˈdraɪtɪs ˈdɪsɪkænz/
- Specialty: Orthopedic surgery

Osteochondritis dissecans (OCD or OD) is a joint disorder primarily of the subchondral bone in which cracks form in the articular cartilage and the underlying subchondral bone. OCD usually causes pain during and after sports. In later stages of the disorder there will be swelling of the affected joint that catches and locks during movement. Physical examination in the early stages does only show pain as symptom, in later stages there could be an effusion, tenderness, and a crackling sound with joint movement.

OCD is caused by blood deprivation of the secondary physes around the bone core of the femoral condyle. This happens to the epiphyseal vessels under the influence of repetitive overloading of the joint during running and jumping sports. During growth such chondronecrotic areas grow into the subchondral bone. There it will show as bone defect area under articular cartilage. The bone will then possibly heal to the surrounding condylar bone in 50% of the cases. Or it will develop into a pseudarthrosis between condylar bone core and osteochondritis flake leaving the articular cartilage it supports prone to damage. The damage is executed by ongoing sport overload. The result is fragmentation (dissection) of both cartilage and bone, and the free movement of these bone and cartilage fragments within the joint space, causing pain, blockage and further damage. OCD has a typical anamnesis with pain during and after sports without any history of trauma. Some symptoms of late stages of osteochondritis dissecans are found with other diseases like rheumatoid disease of children and meniscal ruptures. The disease can be confirmed by X-rays, computed tomography (CT) or magnetic resonance imaging (MRI) scans.

Non-surgical treatment is successful in 50% of the cases. If in late stages the lesion is unstable and the cartilage is damaged, surgical intervention is an option as the ability for articular cartilage to heal is limited. When possible, non-operative forms of management such as protected reduced or non-weight bearing and immobilization are used. Surgical treatment includes arthroscopic drilling of intact lesions, securing of cartilage flap lesions with pins or screws, drilling and replacement of cartilage plugs, stem cell transplantation, and in very difficult situation in adults joint replacement. After surgery rehabilitation is usually a two-stage process of unloading and physical therapy. Most rehabilitation programs combine efforts to protect the joint with muscle strengthening and range of motion. During an immobilization period, isotonic exercises, such as straight leg raises, are commonly used to restore muscle loss without disturbing the cartilage of the affected joint. Once the immobilization period has ended, physical therapy involves continuous passive motion (CPM) and/or low impact activities, such as walking or swimming.

OCD occurs in 15 to 30 people per 100,000 in the general population each year. Although rare, it is an important cause of joint pain in physically active children and adolescents. Because their bones are still growing, adolescents are more likely than adults to recover from OCD; recovery in adolescents can be attributed to the bone's ability to repair damaged or dead bone tissue and cartilage in a process called bone remodeling. While OCD may affect any joint, the knee tends to be the most commonly affected, and constitutes 75% of all cases. Franz König coined the term osteochondritis dissecans in 1887, describing it as an inflammation of the bone–cartilage interface. Many other conditions were once confused with OCD when attempting to describe how the disease affected the joint, including osteochondral fracture, osteonecrosis, accessory ossification center, osteochondrosis, and hereditary epiphyseal dysplasia. Some authors have used the terms osteochondrosis dissecans and osteochondral fragments as synonyms for OCD.

== Signs and symptoms ==
In osteochondritis dissecans, fragments of cartilage or bone become loose within a joint, leading to pain and inflammation. These fragments are sometimes referred to as joint mice. OCD is a type of osteochondrosis in which a lesion has formed within the cartilage layer itself, giving rise to secondary inflammation. OCD most commonly affects the knee, although it can affect other joints such as the ankle or the elbow.

People with OCD report activity-related pain that develops gradually. Individual complaints usually consist of mechanical symptoms including pain, swelling, catching, locking, popping noises, and buckling / giving way; the primary presenting symptom may be a restriction in the range of movement. Symptoms typically present within the initial weeks of stage I. The onset of stage II occurs within months and offers little time for diagnosis. The disease progresses rapidly beyond stage II, as OCD lesions quickly move from stable cysts or fissures to unstable fragments. Non-specific symptoms, caused by similar injuries such as sprains and strains, can delay a definitive diagnosis.

Physical examination typically reveals fluid in the joint, tenderness, and crepitus. The tenderness may initially spread, but often reverts to a well-defined focal point as the lesion progresses. Just as OCD shares symptoms with common maladies, acute osteochondral fracture has a similar presentation with tenderness in the affected joint, but is usually associated with a fatty hemarthrosis. Although there is no significant pathologic gait or characteristic alignment abnormality associated with OCD, the patient may walk with the involved leg externally rotated in an attempt to avoid tibial spine impingement on the lateral aspect of the medial condyle of the femur.

== Causes ==
Despite much research, the causes remain unclear but include repetitive physical trauma, ischemia (restriction of blood flow), hereditary and endocrine factors, avascular necrosis (loss of blood flow), rapid growth, deficiencies and imbalances in the ratio of calcium to phosphorus, and problems of bone formation. Although the name "osteochondritis" implies inflammation, the lack of inflammatory cells in histological examination suggests a non-inflammatory cause. It is thought that repetitive microtrauma, which leads to microfractures and sometimes an interruption of blood supply to the subchondral bone, may cause subsequent localized loss of blood supply or alteration of growth.

Trauma, rather than avascular necrosis, is thought to cause osteochondritis dissecans in juveniles. In adults, trauma is thought to be the main or perhaps the sole cause, and may be endogenous, exogenous or both. The incidence of repetitive strain injury in young athletes is on the rise and accounts for a significant number of visits to primary care; this reinforces the theory that OCD may be associated with increased participation in sports and subsequent trauma. High-impact sports such as gymnastics, soccer, basketball, lacrosse, football, tennis, squash, baseball and weight lifting may put participants at a higher risk of OCD in stressed joints (knees, ankles and elbows).

Recent case reports suggest that some people may be genetically predisposed to OCD. Families with OCD may have mutations in the aggrecan gene. Studies in horses have implicated specific genetic defects.

== Pathophysiology ==
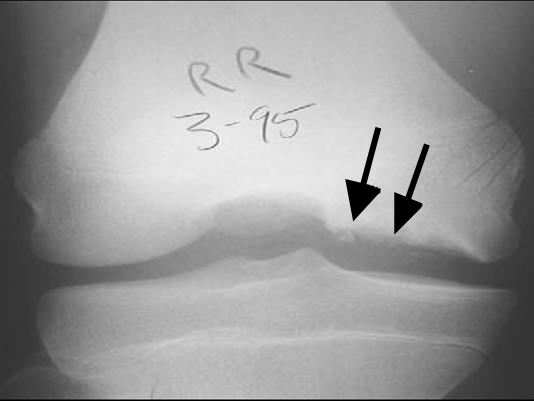
Tunnel or notch view X-ray of the right knee from a patient with osteochondritis dissecans—cystic changes and irregular border are indicated by arrows on the medial side compared to the lateral side

Osteochondritis dissecans differs from "wear and tear" degenerative arthritis, which is primarily an articular surface problem. Instead, OCD is a problem of the bone underlying the cartilage, which may secondarily affect the articular cartilage. Left untreated, OCD can lead to the development of degenerative arthritis secondary to joint incongruity and abnormal wear patterns.

OCD occurs when a loose piece of bone or cartilage partially (or fully) separates from the end of the bone, often because of a loss of blood supply (osteonecrosis) and decalcification of the trabecular bone matrix. The loose piece may stay in place or slide around, making the joint stiff and unstable. OCD in humans most commonly affects the knees, ankles, and elbow but can affect any joint.

In skeletally immature individuals, the blood supply to the epiphyseal bone is good, supporting both osteogenesis and chondrogenesis. With disruption of the epiphyseal plate vessels, varying degrees and depth of necrosis occur, resulting in a cessation of growth to both osteocytes and chondrocytes. In turn, this pattern leads to disordered ossification of cartilage, resulting in subchondral avascular necrosis and consequently OCD.

Four minor stages of OCD have been identified after trauma. These include revascularization and formation of granulation (scar) tissue, absorption of necrotic fragments, intertrabecular osteoid deposition, and remodeling of new bone. With delay in the revascularization stage, an OCD lesion develops. A lesion can lead to articular-surface irregularities, which in turn may cause progressive arthritic deterioration.

== Diagnosis ==
To diagnose osteochondritis dissecans, an X-ray, CT scan or MRI scan can be performed to show necrosis of subchondral bone, formation of loose fragments, or both. Occasionally a nuclear medicine bone scan is used to assess the degree of loosening within the joint.

=== Physical examination ===
Physical examination often begins with examination of the patient's gait. In OCD of the knee, people may walk with the involved leg externally rotated in an attempt to avoid tibial spine impingement on the lateral aspect of the medial condyle of the femur.

Next, the examining physician may check for weakness of the quadriceps. This examination may reveal fluid in the joint, tenderness, and crepitus. The Wilson test is also useful in locating OCD lesions of the femoral condyle. The test is performed by slowly extending the knee from 90 degrees, maintaining internal rotation. Pain at 30 degrees of flexion and relief with tibial external rotation is indicative of OCD.

Physical examination of a patient with ankle OCD often returns symptoms of joint effusion, crepitus, and diffuse or localized tenderness. Examination often reveals symptoms of generalized joint pain, swelling, and times with limited range of motion. Some with loose body lesions may report catching, locking, or both. The possibility of microtrauma emphasizes a need for evaluation of biomechanical forces at the knee in a physical examination. As a result, the alignment and rotation of all major joints in the affected extremity is common, as are extrinsic and intrinsic abnormalities concerning the affected joint, including laxity.

=== Diagnostic imaging ===
X-rays show lucency of the ossification on the anterior aspect of the knee in juvenile patients. In older people, the lesion typically appears as an area of osteosclerotic bone with a radiolucent line between the osteochondral defect and the epiphysis. The visibility of the lesion depends on its location and on the amount of knee flexion used. Harding described the lateral X-ray as a method to identify the site of an OCD lesion.

Magnetic resonance imaging (MRI) is useful for staging OCD lesions, evaluating the integrity of the joint surface, and distinguishing normal variants of bone formation from OCD by showing bone and cartilage edema in the area of the irregularity. MRI provides information regarding features of the articular cartilage and bone under the cartilage, including edema, fractures, fluid interfaces, articular surface integrity, and fragment displacement. A low T1 and high T2 signal at the fragment interface is seen in active lesions. This indicates an unstable lesion or recent microfractures. While MRI and arthroscopy have a close correlation, X-ray films tend to be less inductive of similar MRI results.

Computed tomography (CT) scans and Technetium-99m bone scans are also sometimes used to monitor the progress of treatment. Unlike plain radiographs (X-rays), CT scans and MRI scans can show the exact location and extent of the lesion. Technetium bone scans can detect regional blood flow and the amount of osseous uptake. Both of these seem to be closely correlated to the potential for healing in the fragment.

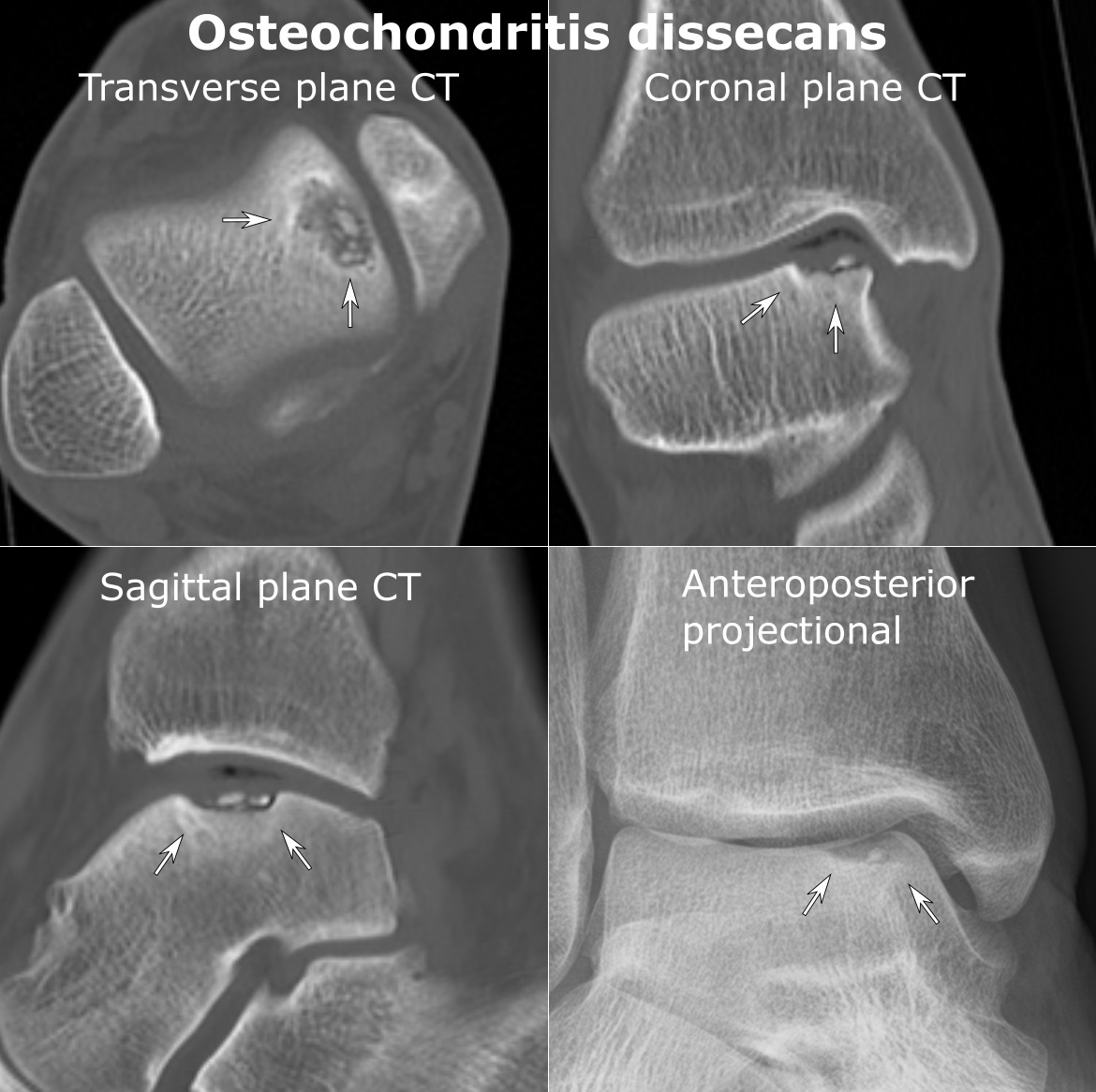
CT scan and projectional radiography of a case of osteochondritis dissecans of parts of the superior-medial talus.

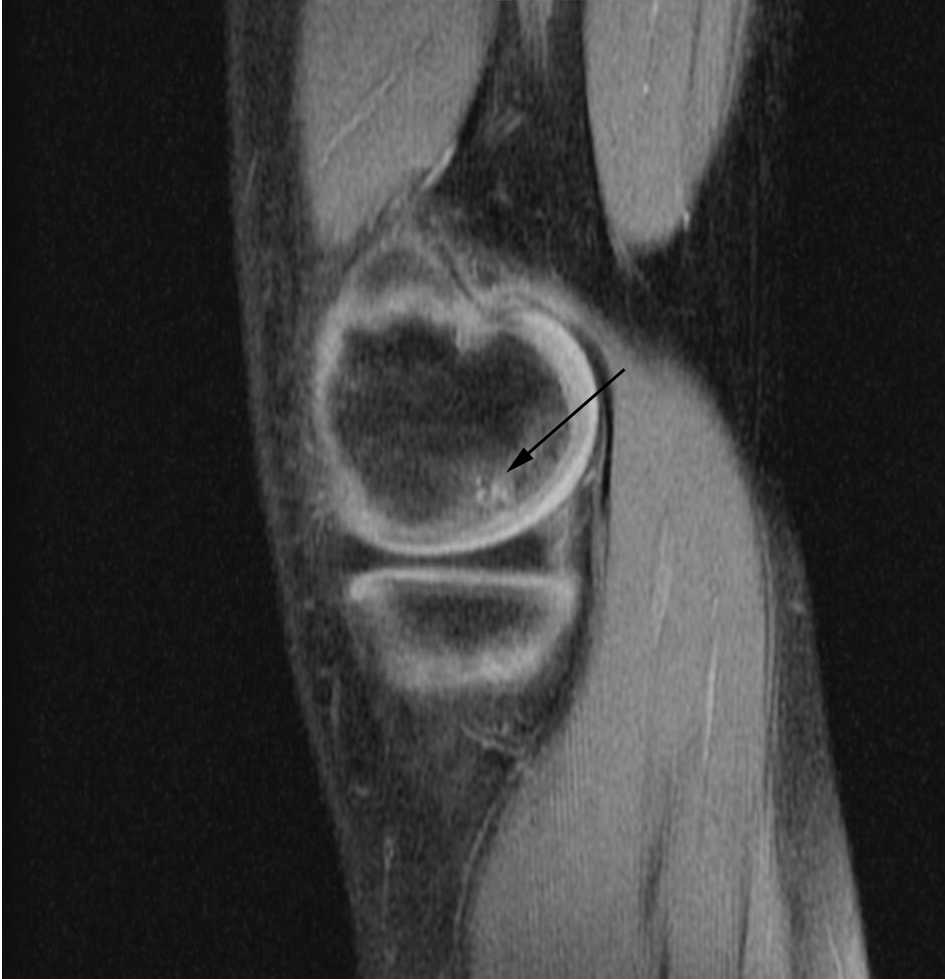
Sagittal MRI: Linear low T1 signal at the articular surfaces of the lateral aspects of the medial condyle of the femur confirms the presence of OCD.

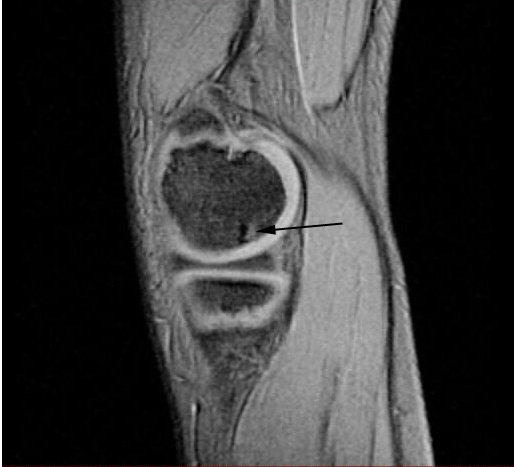
Sagittal MRI: High T2 signal at the articular surfaces of the lateral aspect of the medial femoral condyle confirms the presence of OCD. Diffuse increase in T2 signal at the medial femoral condyle indicates marrow edema.

=== Classification ===
OCD is classified by the progression of the disease in stages. There are two main staging classifications used; one is determined by MRI diagnostic imaging while the other is determined arthroscopically. Both stagings represent the pathological conditions associated with OCD's natural progression.

While the arthroscopic classification of bone and cartilage lesions is considered standard, the Anderson MRI staging is the main form of staging used in this article. Stages I and II are stable lesions. Stages III and IV describe unstable lesions in which a lesion of the cartilage has allowed synovial fluid between the fragment and bone.

MRI staging of osteochondritis dissecans
| Stage | Evaluation | Findings |
|---|---|---|
| I | Stable | Articular cartilage thickening |
| II | Stable | The articular cartilage is breached; low signal behind the fragment indicates fibrous attachment |
| III | Unstable | The articular cartilage is breached; high signal behind the fragment indicates loss of attachment |
| IV | Unstable | Formation of loose bodies |

Cheng arthroscopic staging of osteochondritis dissecans
| Grade | Findings |
|---|---|
| A | Articular cartilage is smooth and intact but may be soft or ballottable |
| B | Articular cartilage has a rough surface |
| C | Articular cartilage has fibrillations or fissures |
| D | Articular cartilage with a flap or exposed bone |
| E | Loose, nondisplaced osteochondral fragment |
| F | Displaced osteochondral fragment |

== Treatment ==
Treatment options include modified activity with or without weight bearing; immobilization; cryotherapy; anti-inflammatory medication; drilling of subchondral bone; microfracture; removal or reattachment of loose bodies; mosaicplasty and osteoarticular transfer system (OATS) procedures. The primary goals of treatment are:

1. Enhance the healing potential of subchondral bone;
2. Fix unstable fragments while maintaining joint congruity; and
3. Replace damaged bone and cartilage with implanted tissues or cells that can grow cartilage.

The articular cartilage's capacity for repair is limited: partial-thickness defects in the articular cartilage do not heal spontaneously, and injuries of the articular cartilage that fail to penetrate subchondral bone tend to lead to deterioration of the articular surface. As a result, surgery is often required in even moderate cases where the osteochondral fragment has not detached from the bone (Anderson Stage II, III).

=== Non-surgical ===
Candidates for non-operative treatment are limited to skeletally immature teenagers with a relatively small, intact lesion and the absence of loose bodies. Non-operative management may include activity modification, protected weight bearing (partial or non-weight bearing), and immobilization. The goal of non-operative intervention is to promote healing in the subchondral bone and prevent potential chondral collapse, subsequent fracture, and crater formation.

Once candidates for treatment have been screened, treatment proceeds according to the lesion's location. For example, those with OCD of the knee are immobilized for four to six weeks or even up to six months in extension to remove shear stress from the involved area. They are permitted to walk with weight bearing as tolerated. X-rays are usually taken three months after the start of non-operative therapy; if they reveal that the lesion has healed, a gradual return to activities is instituted. Those demonstrating healing by increased radiodensity in the subchondral region, or those whose lesions are unchanged, are candidates to repeat the above described three-month protocol until healing is noted.

=== Surgery ===
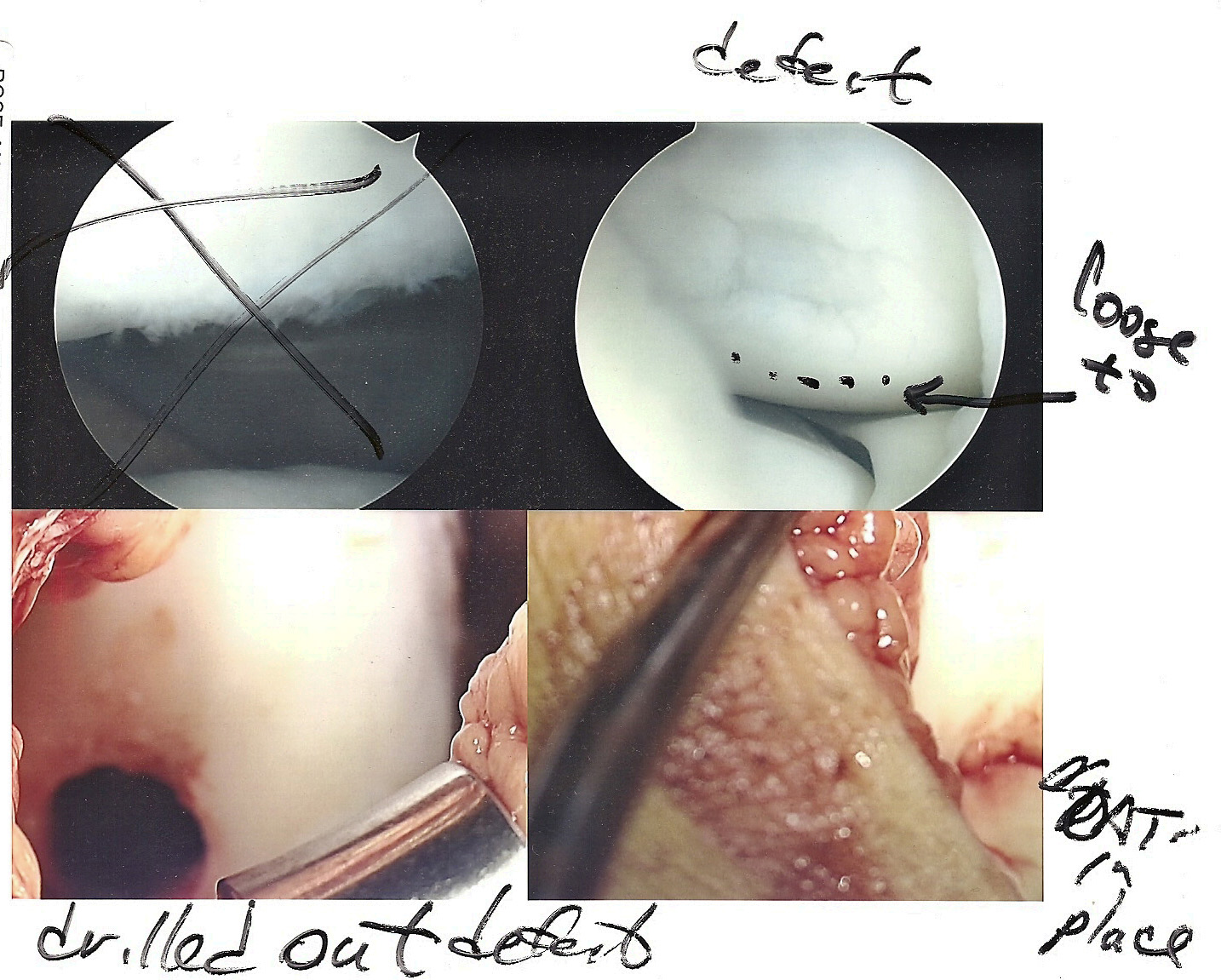
Arthroscopic image of OATS surgery on the medial femoral condyle of the knee

The choice of surgical versus non-surgical treatments for osteochondritis dissecans is controversial. Consequently, the type and extent of surgery necessary varies based on patient age, severity of the lesion, and personal bias of the treating surgeon—entailing an exhaustive list of suggested treatments. A variety of surgical options exist for the treatment of persistently symptomatic, intact, partially detached, and completely detached OCD lesions. Post-surgery reparative cartilage is inferior to healthy hyaline cartilage in glycosaminoglycan concentration, histological, and immunohistochemical appearance. As a result, surgery is often avoided if non-operative treatment is viable.

==== Intact lesions ====
If non-surgical measures are unsuccessful, drilling may be considered to stimulate healing of the subchondral bone. Arthroscopic drilling may be performed by using an antegrade (from the front) approach from the joint space through the articular cartilage, or by using a retrograde (from behind) approach through the bone outside of the joint to avoid penetration of the articular cartilage. This has proven successful with positive results at one-year follow-up with antegrade drilling in nine out of eleven teenagers with the juvenile form of OCD, and in 18 of 20 skeletally immature people (follow-up of five years) who had failed prior conservative programs.

==== Hinged lesions ====
Pins and screws can be used to secure flap (sometimes referred to as hinged) lesions. Bone pegs, metallic pins and screws, and other bioresorbable screws may be used to secure these types of lesions.

==== Full thickness lesions ====
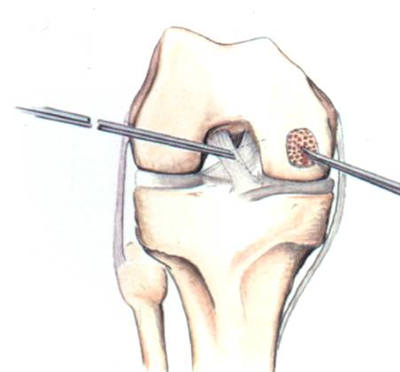
Morselization of the articular cartilage lesion

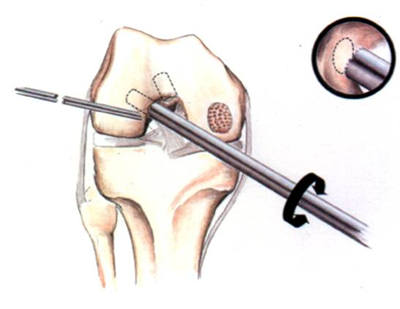
Harvesting of the articular cartilage and bone

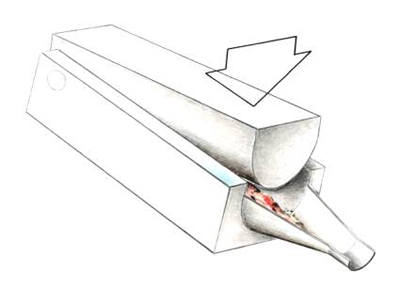
Manual crushing used to make a paste graft

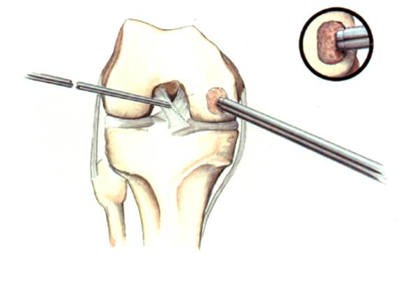
Impacting the paste graft into the morselized defect

The three methods most commonly used in treating full thickness lesions are arthroscopic drilling, abrasion, and microfracturing.

In 1946, Magnusson established the use of stem cells from bone marrow with the first surgical debridement of an OCD lesion. These cells typically differentiate into fibrocartilage and rarely form hyaline cartilage. While small lesions can be resurfaced using this form of surgery, the repair tissue tends to have less strength than normal hyaline cartilage and must be protected for 6 to 12 months. Results for large lesions tend to diminish over time; this can be attributed to the decreased resilience and poor wear characteristics of the fibrocartilage.

In attempts to address the weaker structure of the reparative fibrocartilage, new techniques have been designed to fill the defect with tissue that more closely simulates normal hyaline articular cartilage. One such technique is autologous chondrocyte implantation (ACI), which is useful for large, isolated femoral defects in younger people. In this surgery, chondrocytes are arthroscopically extracted from the intercondylar notch of the articular surface. The chondrocytes are grown and injected into the defect under a periosteal patch. ACI surgery has reported good to excellent results for reduced swelling, pain and locking in clinical follow-up examinations. Some physicians preferred to use undifferentiated pluripotential cells, such as periosteal cells and bone marrow stem cells, as opposed to chondrocytes. These too have demonstrated the ability to regenerate both the cartilage and the underlying subchondral bone.

Similar to OATS, arthroscopic articular cartilage paste grafting is a surgical procedure offering cost-effective, long-lasting results for stage IV lesions. A bone and cartilage paste derived from crushed plugs of the non-weight-bearing intercondylar notch can achieve pain relief, repair damaged tissue, and restore function.

==== Unstable lesions ====
Some methods of fixation for unstable lesions include countersunk compression screws and Herbert screws or pins made of stainless steel or materials that can be absorbed by the body. If loose bodies are found, they are removed. Although each case is unique and treatment is chosen on an individual basis, ACI is generally performed on large defects in skeletally mature people.

==== Rehabilitation ====
Continuous passive motion (CPM) has been used to improve healing of the articular surface during the postoperative period for people with full-thickness lesions. It has been shown to promote articular cartilage healing for small (< 3 mm in diameter) lesions in rabbits. Similarly, Rodrigo and Steadman reported that CPM for six hours per day for eight weeks produced an improved clinical outcome in humans.

A rehabilitation program often involves protection of the compromised articular surface and underlying subchondral bone combined with maintenance of strength and range of motion. Post-operative analgesics, namely a mix of opioids and NSAIDs, are usually required to control pain, inflammation and swelling. Straight leg raising and other isometric exercises are encouraged during the post-operative or immobilization period. A six to eight-week home or formal physical therapy program is usually instituted once the immobilization period has ended, incorporating range of motion, stretching, progressive strengthening, and functional or sport-specific training. During this time, patients are advised to avoid running and jumping, but are permitted to perform low impact activities, such as walking or swimming. If patients return to activity before the cartilage has become firm, they will typically complain of pain during maneuvers such as squatting or jumping.

== Prognosis ==
The prognosis after different treatments varies and is based on several factors that include the age of the patient, the affected joint, the stage of the lesion and, most importantly, the state of the growth plate. It follows that the two main forms of osteochondritis dissecans are defined by skeletal maturity. The juvenile form of the disease occurs in open growth plates, usually affecting children between the ages of 5 and 15 years. The adult form commonly occurs between ages 16 to 50, although it is unclear whether these adults developed the disease after skeletal maturity or were undiagnosed as children.

The prognosis is good for stable lesions (stage I and II) in juveniles with open growth plates; treated conservatively—typically without surgery—50% of cases will heal. Recovery in juveniles can be attributed to the bone's ability to repair damaged or dead bone tissue and cartilage in a process called bone remodeling. Open growth plates are characterized by increased numbers of undifferentiated chondrocytes (stem cells), which are precursors to both bone and cartilaginous tissue. As a result, open growth plates allow for more of the stem cells necessary for repair in the affected joint. Unstable, large, full-thickness lesions (stage III and IV) or lesions of any stage found in the skeletally mature are more likely to fail non-operative treatment. These lesions offer a worse prognosis and surgery is required in most cases.

== Epidemiology ==
OCD is a relatively rare disorder, with an estimated incidence of 15 to 30 cases per 100,000 persons per year. Widuchowski W et al. found OCD to be the cause of articular cartilage defects in 2% of cases in a study of 25,124 knee arthroscopies. Although rare, OCD is noted as an important cause of joint pain in active adolescents. The juvenile form of the disease occurs in children with open growth plates, usually between the ages 5 and 15 years and occurs more commonly in males than females, with a ratio between 2:1 and 3:1. OCD has become more common among adolescent females as they become more active in sports. The adult form, which occurs in those who have reached skeletal maturity, is most commonly found in people 16 to 50 years old.

While OCD may affect any joint, the knee—specifically the medial femoral condyle in 75–85% of knee cases—tends to be the most commonly affected, and constitutes 75% of all cases. The elbow (specifically the capitulum of the humerus) is the second most affected joint with 6% of cases; the talar dome of the ankle represents 4% of cases. Less frequent locations include the patella, vertebrae, the femoral head, and the glenoid of the scapula.

The oldest case of OCD was identified on the temporo-mandibular joint of the Qafzeh 9 fossil.

== History ==
The condition was initially described by Alexander Monro (primus) in 1738. In 1870, James Paget described the disease process for the first time, but it was not until 1887 that Franz König published a paper on the cause of loose bodies in the joint. In his paper, König concluded that:

1. Trauma had to be very severe to break off parts of the joint surface.
2. Less severe trauma might contuse the bone to cause an area of necrosis that might then separate.
3. In some cases, the absence of notable trauma made it likely that there existed some spontaneous cause of separation.

König named the disease "osteochondritis dissecans", describing it as a subchondral inflammatory process of the knee, resulting in a loose fragment of cartilage from the femoral condyle. In 1922, Kappis described this process in the ankle joint. On review of all literature describing transchondral fractures of the talus, Berndt and Harty developed a classification system for staging of osteochondral lesions of the talus (OLTs). The term osteochondritis dissecans has persisted, and has since been broadened to describe a similar process occurring in many other joints, including the knee, hip, elbow, and metatarsophalangeal joints.

== Notable cases ==
- Michael Russell, American tennis player
- Kristina Vaculik, Canadian artistic gymnast
- Jonathan Vilma, American football linebacker
- Seo In-guk, Korean actor

== Veterinary aspects ==
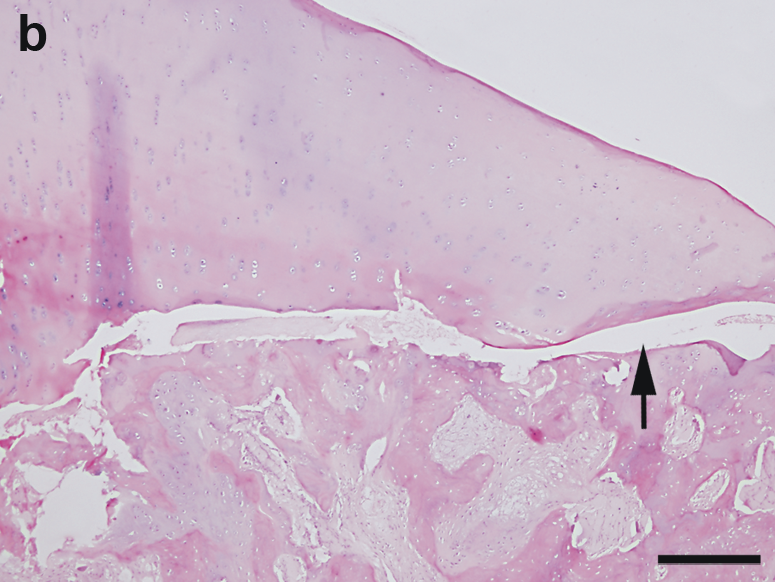
Pathological specimen from a sow— the arrow points to a fracture in the lateral epicondyle of the humerus. Hematoxylin and eosin staining. Bar = 200 μm.

OCD also is found in animals, and is of particular concern in horses, as there may be a hereditary component in some horse breeds. Feeding for forced growth and selective breeding for increased size are also factors. OCD has also been studied in other animals—mainly dogs, especially the German Shepherd—where it is a common primary cause of elbow dysplasia in medium-large breeds.

In animals, OCD is considered a developmental and metabolic disorder related to cartilage growth and endochondral ossification. Osteochondritis itself signifies the disturbance of the usual growth process of cartilage, and OCD is the term used when this affects joint cartilage causing a fragment to become loose.

According to the Columbia Animal Hospital the frequency of affected animals is dogs, humans, pigs, horses, cattle, chickens, and turkeys, and in dogs the most commonly affected breeds include the German Shepherd, Golden and Labrador Retriever, Rottweiler, Great Dane, Bernese Mountain Dog, and Saint Bernard. Although any joint may be affected, those commonly affected by OCD in the dog are: shoulder (often bilaterally), elbow, knee and tarsus.

The problem develops in puppyhood although often subclinically, and there may be pain or stiffness, discomfort on extension, or other compensating characteristics. Diagnosis generally depends on X-rays, arthroscopy, or MRI scans. While cases of OCD of the stifle go undetected and heal spontaneously, others are exhibited in acute lameness. Surgery is recommended once the animal has been deemed lame.

Osteochondritis dissecans is difficult to diagnose clinically as the animal may only exhibit an unusual gait. Consequently, OCD may be masked by, or misdiagnosed as, other skeletal and joint conditions such as hip dysplasia.
