= Osgood–Schlatter disease =

Inflammation of the patellar ligament

Osgood–Schlatter Disease
- Other names: Apophysitis of the tibial tubercle, Lannelongue's disease, osteochondrosis of the tibial tubercle
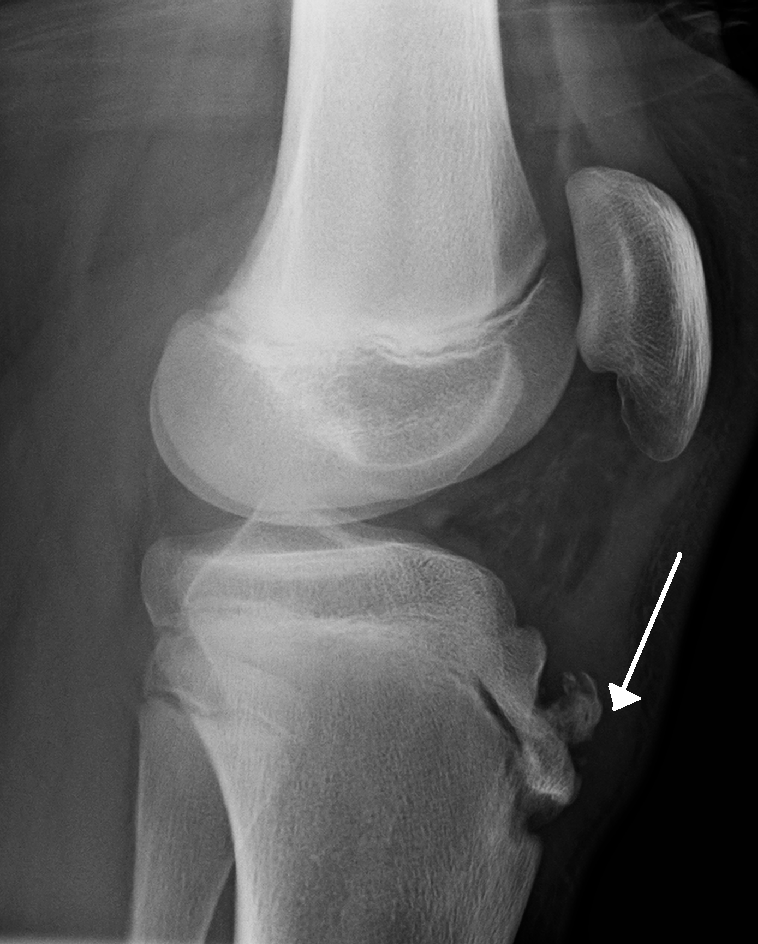
- Lateral view X-ray of the knee demonstrating fragmentation of the tibial tubercle with overlying soft tissue swelling.
- Specialty: Orthopedics
- Symptoms: Painful bump just below the knee, worse with activity and better with rest
- Usual onset: Males between the ages of 10 and 15 Females between 8 and 14
- Duration: Few weeks to years.
- Risk factors: Sports that involve running or jumping
- Diagnostic method: Based on symptoms
- Treatment: Applying cold, stretching, strengthening exercises
- Medication: NSAIDs
- Prognosis: Good
- Frequency: ~4%

Osgood–Schlatter disease (OSD) is inflammation of the patellar ligament at the tibial tuberosity (apophysitis) usually affecting adolescents during growth spurts. It is characterized by a painful bump just below the knee that is worse with activity and better with rest. Episodes of pain typically last a few weeks to months and are very painful. One or both knees may be affected and flares may recur.

Risk factors include overuse, especially sports which involve frequent running or jumping. The underlying mechanism is repeated tension on the growth plate of the upper tibia. Diagnosis is typically based on the symptoms. A plain X-ray may be either normal or show fragmentation in the attachment area.

Pain typically resolves with time. Applying cold to the affected area, rest, stretching, and strengthening exercises may help. NSAIDs such as ibuprofen may be used. Slightly less stressful activities such as swimming or walking may be recommended. Casting the leg for a period of time may help. After growth slows, typically age 16 in boys and 14 in girls, the pain will no longer occur despite a bump potentially remaining.

About 4% of people are affected at some point in time. Males between the ages of 10 and 15 are most often affected. The condition is named after Robert Bayley Osgood (1873–1956), an American orthopedic surgeon, and Carl B. Schlatter (1864–1934), a Swiss surgeon, who described the condition independently in 1903.

== Signs and symptoms ==
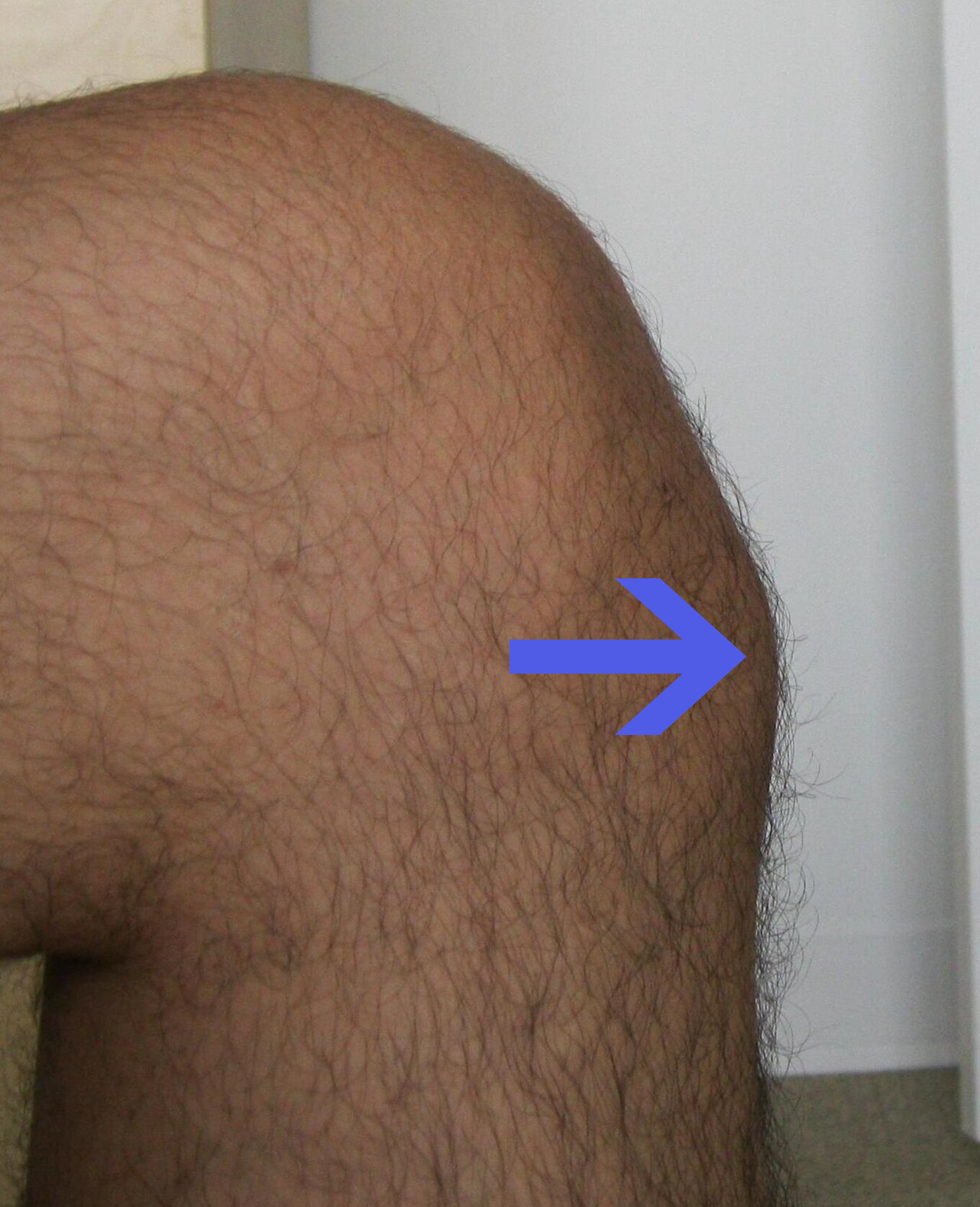
Knee of a male with Osgood–Schlatter disease

Osgood–Schlatter disease causes pain in the front lower part of the knee. This is usually at the ligament-bone junction of the patellar ligament and the tibial tuberosity. The tibial tuberosity is a slight elevation of bone on the anterior and proximal portion of the tibia. The patellar tendon attaches the anterior quadriceps muscles to the tibia via the knee cap.

Intense knee pain is usually the presenting symptom that occurs during activities such as running, jumping, lifting things, squatting, and especially ascending or descending stairs and during kneeling. The pain is worse with acute knee impact. The pain can be reproduced by extending the knee against resistance, stressing the quadriceps, or striking the knee. Pain is initially mild and intermittent. In the acute phase, the pain is severe and continuous in nature. Impact of the affected area can be very painful. Bilateral symptoms are observed in 20–30% of people.

== Risk factors ==
Risk factors include overuse, especially sports which involve running or jumping. The underlying mechanism is repeated tension on the growth plate of the upper tibia. It also occurs frequently in male pole vaulters aged 14–22.

== Diagnosis ==
Diagnosis is made based on signs and symptoms.

=== Ultrasonography ===
This test can see various warning signs that predict if OSD might occur. Ultrasonography can detect if there is any tissue swelling and cartilage swelling. Ultrasonography's main goal is to identify OSD in the early stage rather than later on. It has unique features such as detection of an increase of swelling within the tibia or the cartilage surrounding the area and can also see if there is any new bone starting to build up around the tibial tuberosity.

=== Types ===
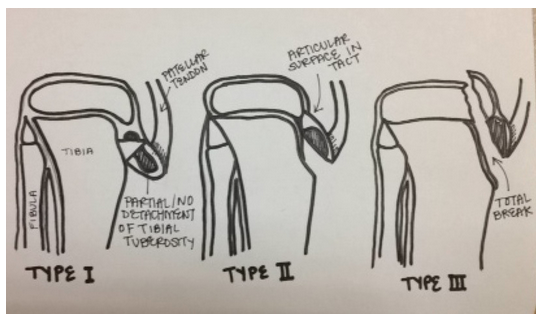
Three types of avulsion fractures.

OSD may result in an avulsion fracture, with the tibial tuberosity separating from the tibia (usually remaining connected to a tendon or ligament). This injury is uncommon because there are mechanisms that prevent strong muscles from doing damage. The fracture on the tibial tuberosity can be a complete or incomplete break.

Type I: A small fragment is displaced proximally and does not require surgery.

Type II: The articular surface of the tibia remains intact and the fracture occurs at the junction where the secondary center of ossification and the proximal tibial epiphysis come together (may or may not require surgery).

Type III: Complete fracture (through articular surface) including high chance of meniscal damage. This type of fracture usually requires surgery.

=== Differential diagnosis ===
Sinding-Larsen and Johansson syndrome, is an analogous condition involving the patellar tendon and the lower margin of the patella bone, instead of the upper margin of the tibia.

== Prevention ==
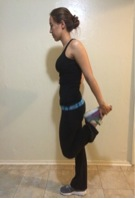
Example of how to stretch the quadriceps muscle.

One of the main ways to prevent OSD is to check the participant's flexibility in their quadriceps and hamstrings. Lack of flexibility in these muscles can be a direct risk indicator for OSD. Muscles can shorten, which can cause pain but this is not permanent. Stretches can help reduce shortening of the muscles. The main stretches for prevention of OSD focus on the hamstrings and quadriceps.

Direct stretching of the quadriceps can be painful so the use of foam rolling for self myofascial release can help gently restore flexibility and range of movement

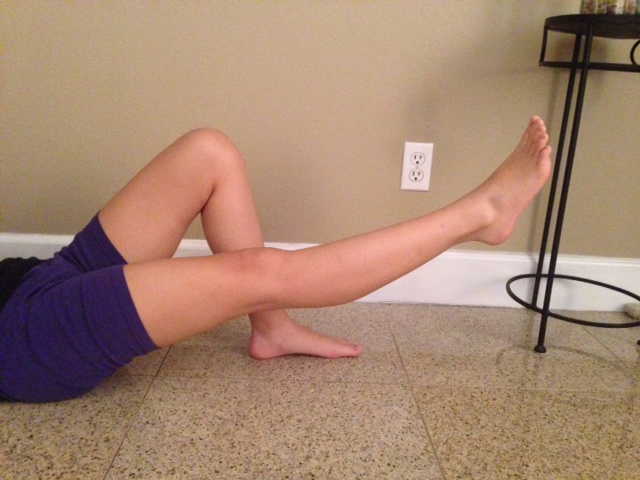
Straight leg raises help strengthen the quadriceps without the need to bend the knee. The knee should be kept straight, legs should be lifted and lowered slowly, and reps should be held for three to five seconds.

== Treatment ==
Treatment is generally conservative with rest, ice, and specific exercises being recommended. Simple pain medication may be used such as acetaminophen (paracetamol), or NSAIDs such as ibuprofen. Saline injections have also been proposed for pain reduction. Typically symptoms resolve as the growth plate closes. Physiotherapy is generally recommended once the initial symptoms have improved to prevent recurrence. Surgery may rarely be used in those who have stopped growing yet still have symptoms.

=== Physiotherapy ===
Recommended efforts include exercises to improve the strength of the gluteals, quadriceps, hamstring and gastrocnemius muscles.

Bracing or use of an orthopedic cast to enforce joint immobilization is rarely required and does not necessarily encourage a quicker resolution. However, bracing may give comfort and help reduce pain as it reduces strain on the tibial tubercle.

=== Surgery ===
Surgical excision may rarely be required in people who have stopped growing. Surgical removal of the ossicles generally results in good outcomes, with symptoms improvement after several weeks.

=== Rehabilitation ===
Rehabilitation focuses on muscle strengthening, gait training, and pain control to restore knee function. Nonsurgical treatments for less severe symptoms include: exercises for strength, stretches to increase range of motion, ice packs, knee tape, knee braces, anti-inflammatory agents, and electrical stimulation to control inflammation and pain. Quadriceps and hamstring exercises are commonly prescribed by rehabilitation experts restore flexibility and muscle strength.

Isometric exercises, such as isometric leg extensions, have been shown to strengthen the knee, reduce pain and inhibition, and help the tissue repair through Mechanotransduction.

Other exercises can include leg raises, squats, and wall stretches to increase quadriceps and hamstring strength. This helps to avoid pain, stress, and tight muscles that lead to further injury that oppose healing.

Education and knowledge on stretches and exercises are important. Exercises should lack pain and increase gradually with intensity. The patient is given strict guidelines on how to perform exercises at home to avoid more injury. Exercises can include leg raises, squats and wall stretches to increase quadriceps and hamstring strength. This helps to avoid pain, stress, and tight muscles that lead to further injury that oppose healing. Knee orthotics such as patella straps and knee sleeves help decrease force traction and prevent painful tibia contact by restricting unnecessary movement, providing support, and also adding compression to the area of pain.

== Prognosis ==
The condition is usually self-limiting and is caused by stress on the patellar tendon that attaches the quadriceps muscle at the front of the thigh to the tibial tuberosity. Following an adolescent growth spurt, repeated stress from contraction of the quadriceps is transmitted through the patellar tendon to the immature tibial tuberosity. This can cause multiple subacute avulsion fractures along with inflammation of the tendon, leading to excess bone growth in the tuberosity and producing a visible lump which can be very painful, especially when hit. Activities such as kneeling may also irritate the tendon.

The syndrome may develop without trauma or other apparent cause; however, some studies report up to 50% of patients relate a history of precipitating trauma. Several authors have tried to identify the actual underlying etiology and risk factors that predispose Osgood–Schlatter disease and postulated various theories. However, currently, it is widely accepted that Osgood–Schlatter disease is a traction apophysitis of the proximal tibial tubercle at the insertion of the patellar tendon caused by repetitive micro-trauma. In other words, Osgood–Schlatter disease is an overuse injury and closely related to the physical activity of the child. It was shown that children who actively participate in sports are affected more frequently as compared with non-participants. In a retrospective study of adolescents, old athletes actively participating in sports showed a frequency of 21% reporting the syndrome compared with only 4.5% of age-matched nonathletic controls.

The symptoms usually resolve with treatment but may recur for 12–24 months before complete resolution at skeletal maturity, when the tibial epiphysis fuses. In some cases the symptoms do not resolve until the patient is fully grown. In approximately 10% of patients the symptoms continue unabated into adulthood, despite all conservative measures.

=== Long-term implications ===
OSD occurs from the combined effects of tibial tuberosity immaturity and quadriceps tightness. There is a possibility of migration of the ossicle or fragmentation in Osgood-Schlatter patients. The implications of OSD and the ossification of the tubercle can lead to functional limitations and pain for patients into adulthood.

Of people admitted with OSD, about half were children who were between the ages of 1 and 17. In addition, in 2014, a case study of 261 patients was observed over 12 to 24 months. 237 of these people responded well to sport restriction and non-steroid anti-inflammatory agents, which resulted in recovery to normal athletic activity.

== Epidemiology ==
Osgood–Schlatter disease generally occurs in boys and girls aged 9–16 coinciding with periods of growth spurts. It occurs more frequently in boys than in girls, with reports of a male-to-female ratio ranging from 3:1 to as high as 7:1. It has been suggested that difference is related to a greater participation by boys in sports and risk activities than by girls.

Osgood–Schlatter disease resolves or becomes asymptomatic in the majority of cases. One study showed that 90% of reported patients had symptom resolution in 12–24 months. Because of this short symptomatic period with most patients, the number of people who become diagnosed is a fraction of the true number.

For adolescents between the ages of 12–15, there is a disease prevalence of 9.8% with a greater 11.4% in males and 8.3% in females. Osgood-Schlatter's disease presents bilaterally in a range of about 20%-30% of patients.

It was found that the leading cause for the incidence of the disease was regular sport practicing and shortening of the rectus femoris muscle in adolescents that were in the pubertal phase. There is a 76% prevalence of patients with a shortened rectus femoris in those who have the Osgood-Schlatter's disease. This risk ratio shows the anatomical relationship between the tibial tuberosity and the quadriceps muscle group, which connect through the patella and its ligamentous structures.

In a survey of patients with the diagnosis, 97% reported to have pain during palpation over the tibial tuberosity. The high risk ratio with people with the disease and palpatory pain is likely the reason that the number one diagnosis method is with physical examination, rather than imaging as most bone pathologies are diagnosed.

Research suggests that Osgood–Schlatter disease also increases the risk of tibial fractures. It's possible that the rapid tuberosity bone development and other changes to the proximal aspect of the knee with those who have the disease is the culprit to the increased risk.

Because increased activity is a risk factor for developing Osgood–Schlatter disease there is also research that may suggest children and adolescents with ADHD are at higher risk. Increased activity and stress on the tibial tuberosity would be greater in a more active population in the 9-16 age bracket, but this study was still not conclusive as to which aspect of ADHD was the cause of the higher incidence.
