= Microtrauma =

Small injury to the body

Microtrauma is any of many possible small injuries to the body.

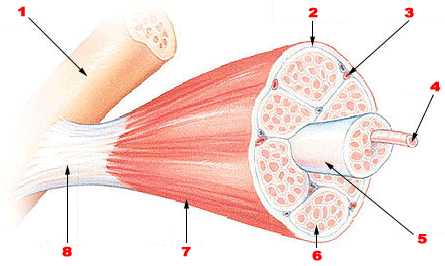
Muscle fibres may be "microtorn" during microtrauma.

Microtrauma can include the microtearing of muscle fibres, the sheath around the muscle and the connective tissue. It can also include stress to the tendons, and to the bones (see Wolff's law). It is unknown whether or not the ligaments adapt like this. Microtrauma to the skin (compression, impact, abrasion) can also cause increases in a skin's thickness, as seen from the calluses formed from running barefoot or the hand calluses that result from rock climbing. This might be due to increased skin cell replication at sites under stress where cells rapidly slough off or undergo compression or abrasion.

Most microtrauma cause a low level of inflammation that cannot be seen or felt. These injuries can arise in muscle, ligament, vertebrae, and discs, either singly or in combination. Repetitive microtrauma which are not allowed time to heal can result in the development of more serious conditions, such as more serious injuries, tendinitis, stress fracture, and tissue degeneration.

Microtrauma may be a significant risk factor for further injury to active individuals with a U.S. military report stating that over 70% of mechanical injuries to active-duty U.S. soldiers being caused by acclimated microtrauma compared to 25% of mechanical injuries being caused by acute trauma.

== Negative effects ==
Back pain can develop gradually as a result of microtrauma brought about by repetitive activity over time. Because of the slow and progressive onset of this internal injury, the condition is often ignored until the symptoms become acute, often resulting in disabling injury. Acute back injuries can arise from stressful lifting techniques done without adequate recovery, especially when experimenting with more ballistic work, or work where the extensor spinae are stressed during spinal flexion when much of the load is commonly taken up by the slower to heal ligaments which may not adapt progressively to the stress. While the acute injury may seem to be caused by a single well-defined incident, it may have been preventable or lessened if not for the years of injury to the musculoskeletal support mechanism by repetitive microtrauma.

== Positive effects ==
It was previously thought that microtrauma from stress (such as lifting weights) to muscles can be rebuilt and overcompensate to reduce the likeliness of re-injury. However, new research has surfaced stating that microtrauma is not significant in hypertrophy, but that mechanical tension and metabolic stress are the primary drivers in muscular hypertrophy, alongside motor unit recruitment. This is a result of progressive overload, which leads to mechanical tension (in the context of muscular hypertrophy.)

== See also ==
- Delayed onset muscle soreness
