= Vastus muscles =

Human thigh muscles

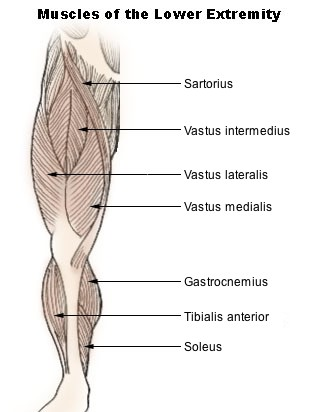
- Muscles of lower extremity (Rectus Femoris has been removed)

Details
- Origin: Femur
- Insertion: Quadriceps tendon
- Artery: Femoral artery
- Nerve: Femoral nerve
- Actions: Extension of knee joint

The vastus muscles are three of the four muscles that make up the quadriceps femoris muscle of the thigh. The three muscles are the vastus intermedius, the vastus lateralis, and the vastus medialis located in the middle, on the outside, and inside of the thigh, respectively. The fourth muscle is the rectus femoris muscle a large fleshy muscle which covers the front and sides of the femur.

== Vastus intermedius ==
The vastus intermedius arises from the front and lateral surfaces of the body of the femur in its upper two-thirds, sitting under the rectus femoris muscle and from the lower part of the lateral intermuscular septum. Its fibers end in a superficial aponeurosis, which forms the deep part of the quadriceps tendon.

The vastus medialis and vastus intermedius appear to be inseparably united, but when the rectus femoris has been reflected a narrow interval will be observed extending upward from the medial border of the patella between the two muscles, and the separation may be continued as far as the lower part of the intertrochanteric line, where, however, the two muscles are frequently continuous.

== Vastus lateralis ==
The vastus lateralis is the largest and most powerful of the three vasti muscles. It arises from the several areas of the femur, including the upper part of the intertrochanteric line; the lower, anterior borders of the greater trochanter, to the outer border of the gluteal tuberosity, and the upper half of the outer border of the linea aspera. These form an aponeurosis, a broad flat tendon which covers the upper three-quarters of the muscle. From the inner surface of the aponeurosis, many muscle fibres originate. Some additional fibres arise from the tendon of the gluteus maximus muscle, and from the septum between the vastus lateralis and short head of the biceps femoris.

The fibers form a large fleshy mass, attached to a second strong aponeurosis, placed on the deep surface of the lower part of the muscle. This lower aponeurosis becomes contracted and thickened into a flat tendon that attaches to the outer border of the patella, and subsequently joins with the quadriceps femoris tendon, expanding the capsule of the knee joint.

== Vastus medialis ==
The vastus medialis arises medially along the entire length of the femur, and attaches with the other muscles of the quadriceps in the quadriceps tendon. The vastus medialis muscle originates from a continuous line of attachment on the femur, which begins on the front and middle side (anteromedially) on the intertrochanteric line of the femur. It continues down and back (posteroinferiorly) along the pectineal line and then descends along the inner lip of the linea aspera and onto the medial supracondylar line of the femur. The fibers converge onto the medial part of the quadriceps tendon and the medial border of the patella. The obliquus genus muscle is the most distal segment of the vastus medialis muscle. Its specific training plays an important role in maintaining patella position and limiting injuries to the knee. With no clear delineation, it is simply the most distal group of fibers of the vastus medialis.

== Additional images ==
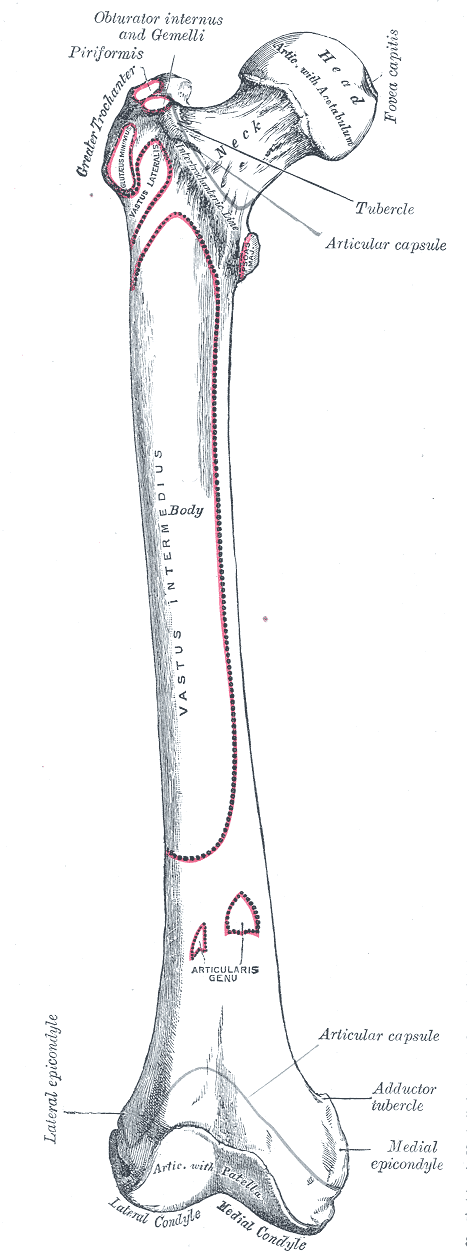
Right femur. Anterior surface.

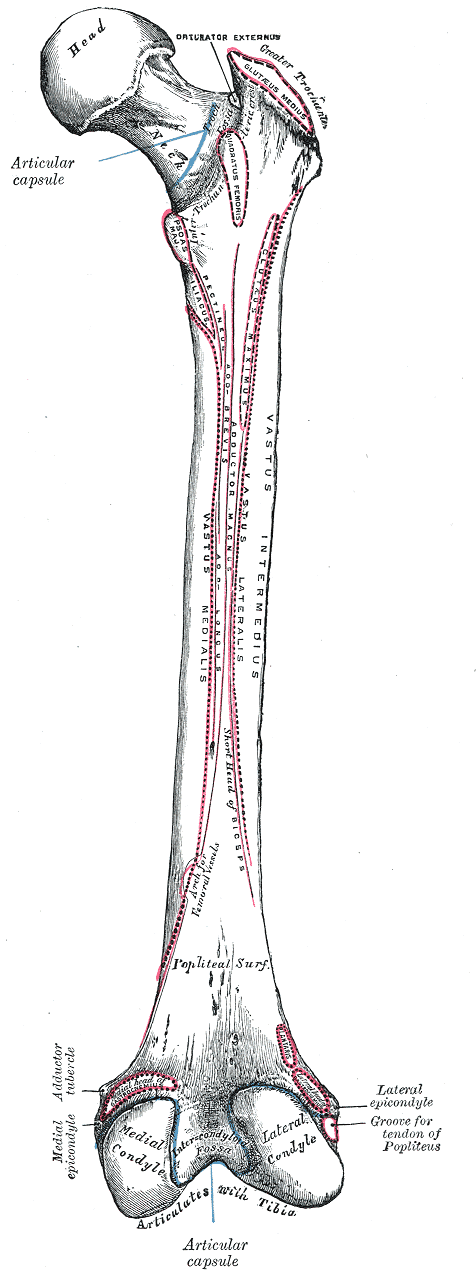
Right femur. Posterior surface.

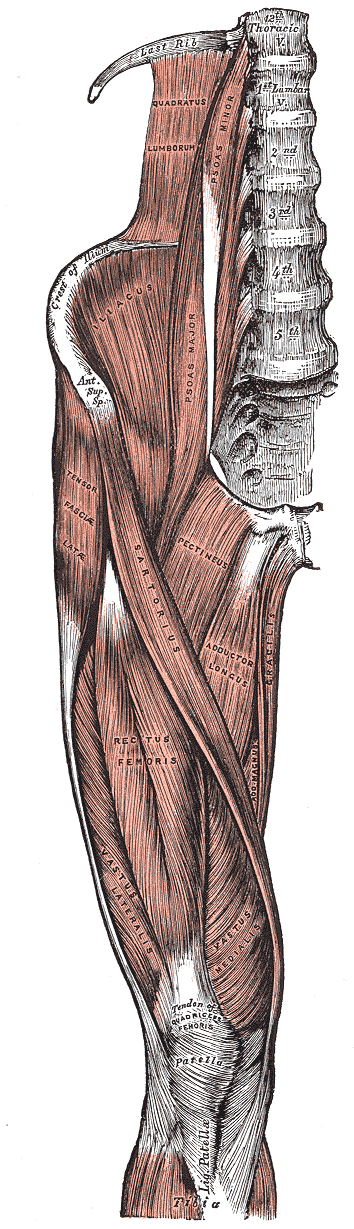
Muscles of the iliac and anterior femoral regions.

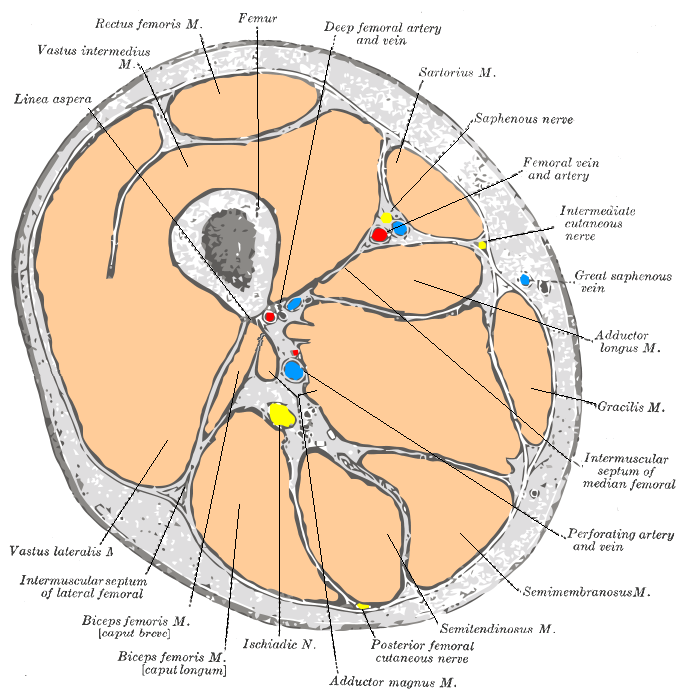
Cross-section through the middle of the thigh.

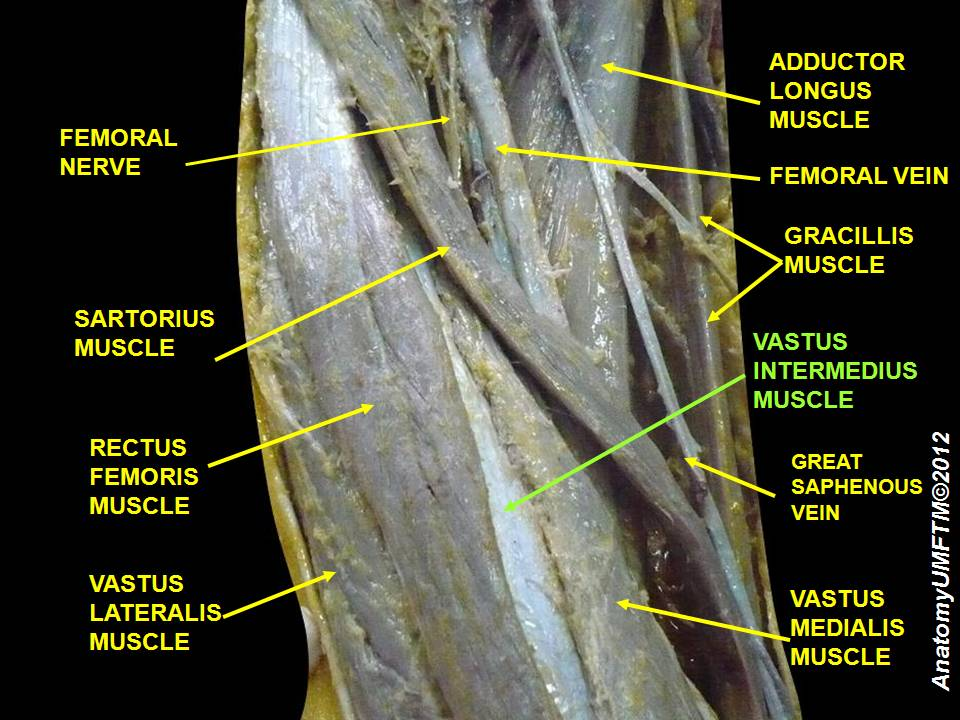
Vastus intermedius muscle

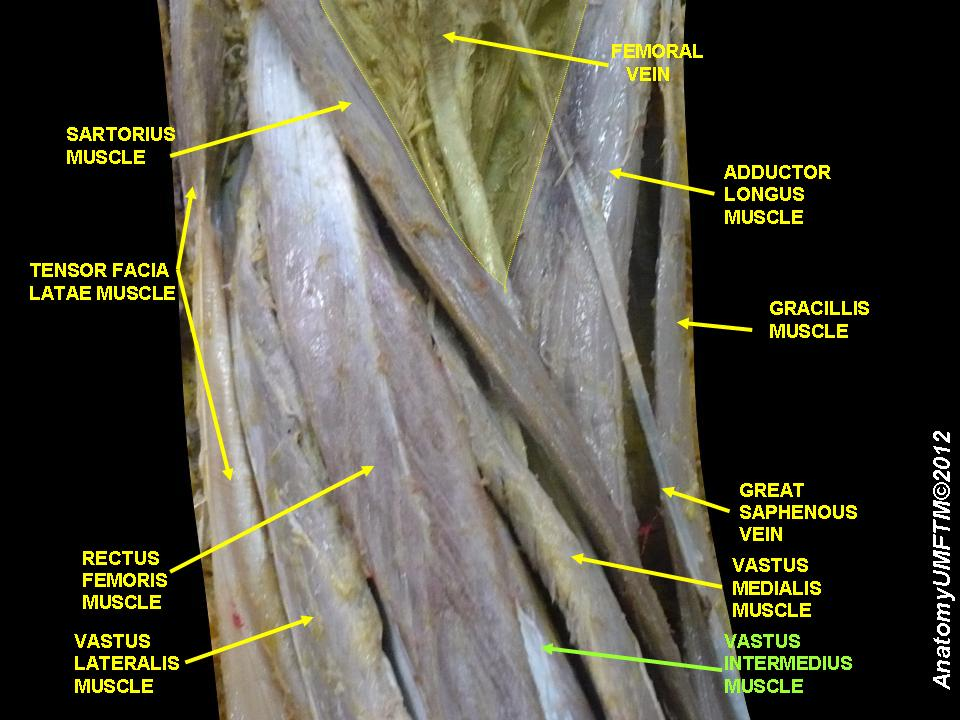
Vastus intermedius muscle

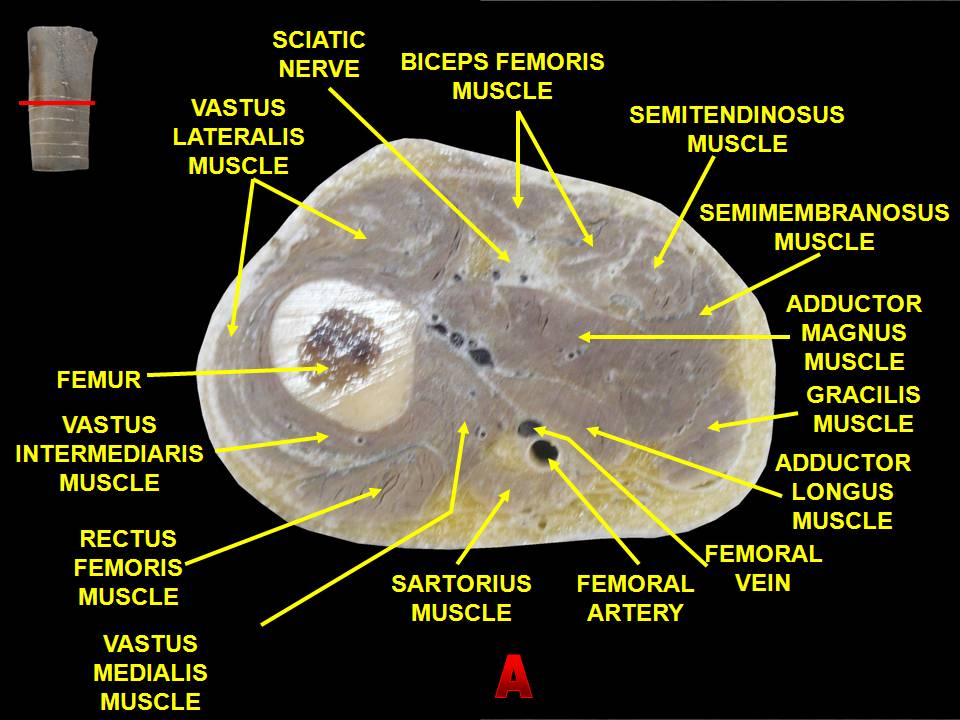
Muscles of thigh. Cross section.

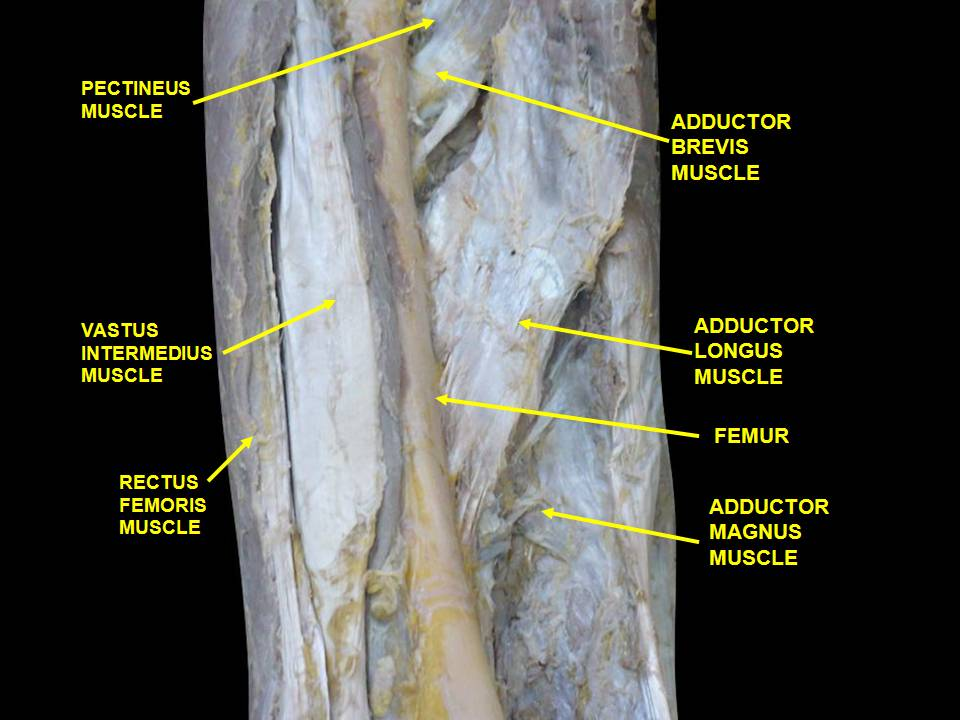
Muscles of Thigh. Anterior views.
