= Tensor vastus intermedius muscle =

Thigh muscle

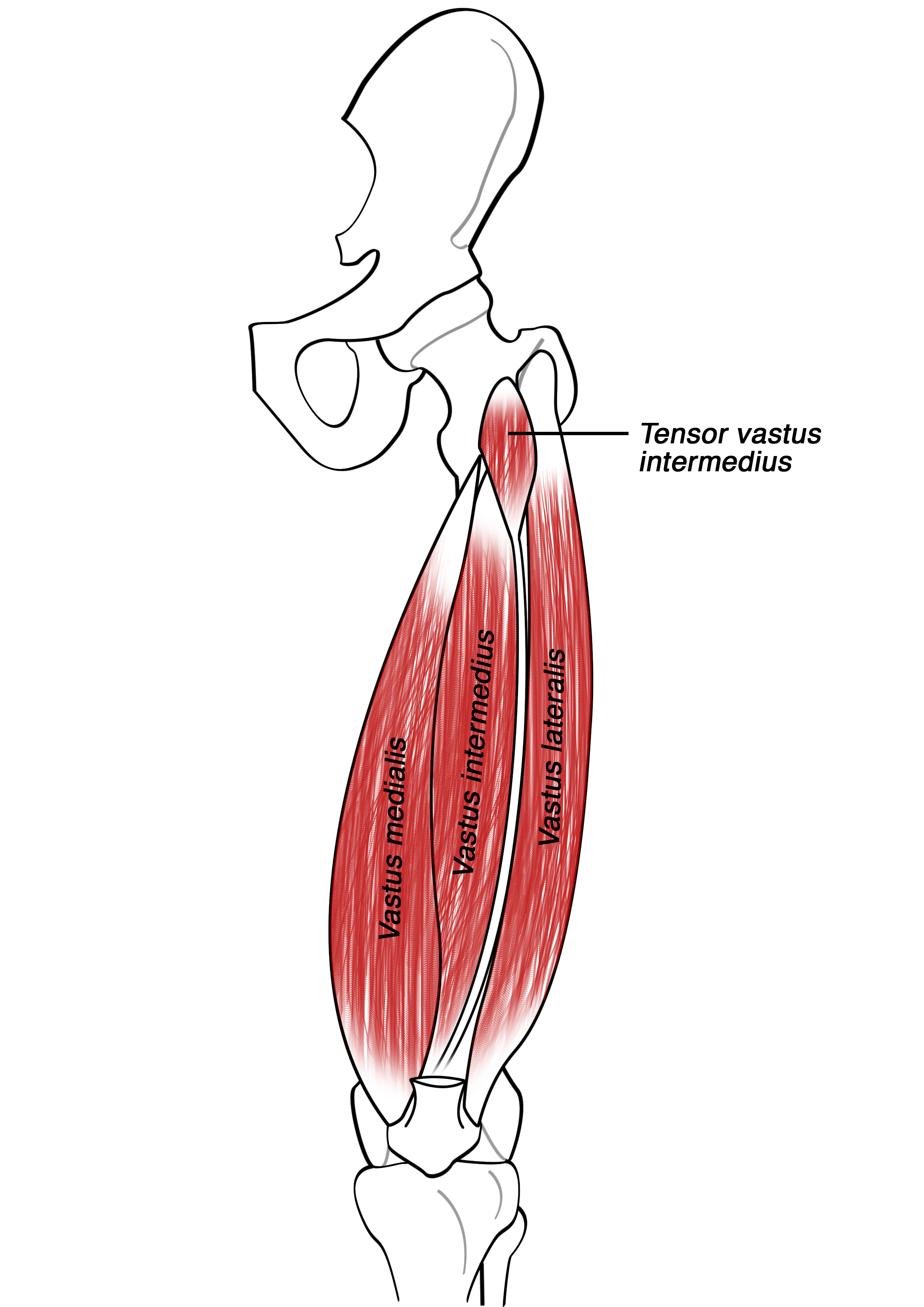
- Tensor vastus intermedius muscle

Details
- Origin: anterior aspect of the greater trochanter
- Insertion: medial aspect of the patella
- Artery: lateral circumflex femoral artery
- Nerve: femoral nerve
- Actions: Medialises the action and tenses on the aponeurosis of the vastus intermedius

Identifiers
- Latin: Musculus tensor vastus intermedius

The tensor vastus intermedius is a muscle in the anterior compartment of thigh. It lies between the vastus intermedius and the vastus lateralis. The term tensor vastus intermedius was given by Grob et al. in 2016, although the structure had been reported previously.

== Structure ==
The tensor vastus intermedius muscle originates from the proximal part of femur specifically from the anterior part of the greater trochanter. The muscle lies anterior to the vastus intermedius but deep to the rectus femoris. The tendinous part of the muscle is closely related to, and sometimes fuses with, the aponeurosis of the vastus intermedius. Distally, it joins the quadriceps tendon and inserts to the medial aspect of the patella. It is supplied by the femoral nerve and the lateral circumflex femoral artery.

=== Variations ===
This muscle is categorised into five types according to morphology: the independent type, VI-type, VL-type, common type and two-belly type. The independent type of the tensor vastus intermedius, also the most frequent type, has its tendon lying between the vastus intermedius and the vastus lateralis. For the VI-type and the VL-type, the tendinous part of the muscle is integrated into the fascia of the vastus intermedius and the vastus lateralis respectively. For the common type, it has a non-separable origin between the intertrochanteric line and greater trochanter. Two separate muscle bellies can be found for the two-belly types.

== Functions ==
The tensor vastus intermedius muscle tenses on the aponeurosis of the vastus intermedius and also medialises the action of the muscle. It also acts as a second tensor in addition to the tensor fasciae latae.

== Muscle architecture ==
Ultrasound studies have provided insight into the muscle architecture of this musculature and its long tendon. Particularly, these studies have suggested that the tensor of vastus intermedius has a small cross-sectional area compared to other individual quadriceps muscles.

== See also ==
- Quadriceps femoris muscle
- Anterior compartment of thigh
