= List of extensors of the human body =

In anatomy, extension is a movement of a joint that increases the angle between two bones or body surfaces at a joint. Extension usually results in straightening of the bones or body surfaces involved. For example, extension is produced by extending the flexed (bent) elbow. Straightening of the arm would require extension at the elbow joint. If the head is tilted all the way back, the neck is said to be extended.

== Extensor muscles ==
=== Upper limb ===
- of arm at shoulder
  - Axilla and shoulder
    - Latissimus dorsi
    - Posterior fibres of deltoid
    - Teres major
- of forearm at elbow
  - Posterior compartment of the arm
    - Triceps brachii
    - Anconeus
- of hand at wrist
  - Posterior compartment of the forearm
    - Extensor carpi radialis longus
    - Extensor carpi radialis brevis
    - Extensor carpi ulnaris
    - Extensor digitorum
- of phalanges, at all joints
  - Posterior compartment of the forearm
    - Extensor digitorum
    - Extensor digiti minimi (little finger only)
    - Extensor indicis (index finger only)
- of phalanges, at interphalangeal joints
  - Lumbricals of the hand
  - Dorsal interossei of the hand
  - Palmar interossei
- of thumb
  - Extensor pollicis brevis (proximal phalange)
  - Extensor pollicis longus (distal phalange)

=== Lower limb ===
==== Hip ====
- of thigh/femur at hip
  - Gluteus maximus
  - Posterior compartment of thigh
    - Biceps femoris
    - Semitendinosus
    - Semimembranosus

==== Knee ====
- of leg at knee (L3-L4)
  - Quadriceps
    - Rectus femoris muscle
    - Vastus medialis
    - Vastus lateralis
    - Vastus intermedius

==== Toes ====
- of toes
  - Extensor hallucis longus
  - Extensor digitorum longus
  - Extensor digitorum brevis
  - Extensor hallucis brevis

== See also ==
- List of flexors of the human body
