= Tuberosity of the tibia =

Slight protrusion at the top front end

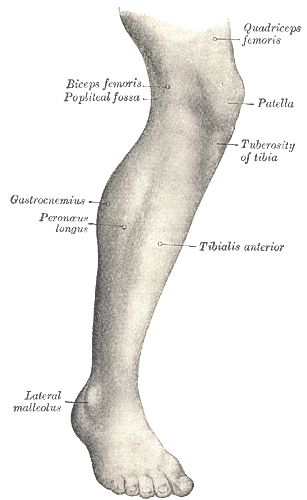
- Lateral aspect of right leg. (Tuberosity of tibia labeled at center right.)

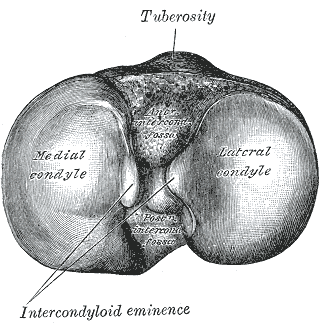
- Upper surface of right tibia. (Tuberosity labeled at top.)

Details

Identifiers
- Latin: tuberositas tibiae
- TA98: A02.5.06.012
- TA2: 1413
- FMA: 35463

The tuberosity of the tibia, tibial tuberosity or tibial tubercle is an elevation on the proximal, anterior aspect of the tibia, just below where the anterior surfaces of the lateral and medial tibial condyles end.

== Structure ==
The tuberosity of the tibia gives attachment to the patellar ligament, which attaches to the patella from where the suprapatellar ligament forms the distal tendon of the quadriceps femoris muscles. The quadriceps muscles consist of the rectus femoris, vastus lateralis, vastus medialis, and vastus intermedius. These quadriceps muscles are innervated by the femoral nerve. The tibial tuberosity thus forms the terminal part of the large structure that acts as a lever to extend the knee-joint and prevents the knee from collapsing when the foot strikes the ground. The two ligaments, the patella, and the tibial tuberosity are all superficial, easily palpable structures.

== Fractures ==
Tibial tuberosity fractures are infrequent fractures, most common in adolescents. In running and jumping movements, extreme contraction of the knee extensors can result in avulsion fractures of the tuberosity apophysis. A cast is all that is required if the fragment is not displaced from its normal position on the tibia. However, if the fracture fragment is displaced, then surgery is necessary to allow for normal function.

== See also ==
Tenderness in the tibial tuberosity can arise from Osgood-Schlatter disease or deep infrapatellar bursitis. A bony prominence on the tibial tuberosity can be the result of ongoing Osgood-Schlatter's irritation in an adolescent with open growth plates, or what remains of Osgood-Schlatter's in adults.

== Additional images ==
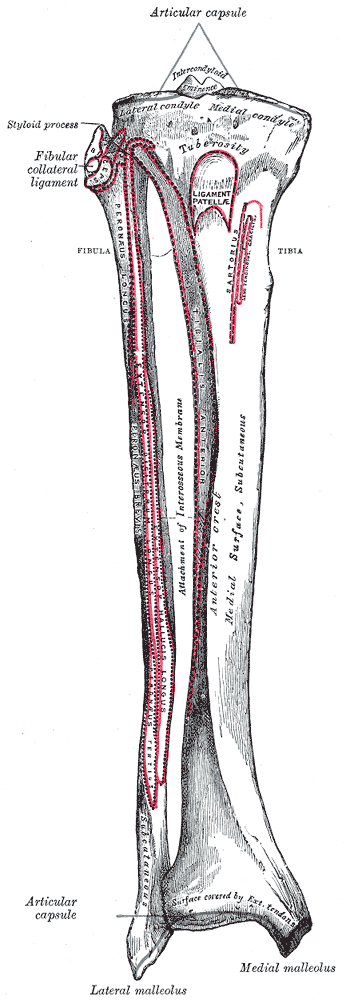
Bones of the right leg. Anterior surface.

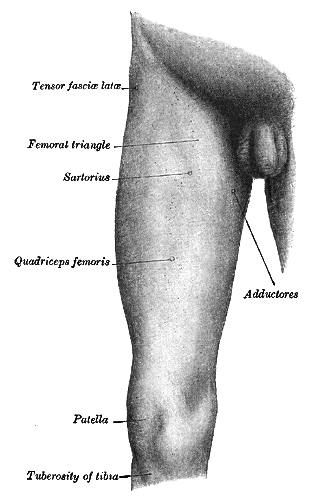
Front and medial aspect of right thigh.
