= Femoral nerve dysfunction =

Peripheral nervous system disorder

Femoral nerve dysfunction, also known as femoral neuropathy, is a rare type of peripheral nervous system disorder that arises from damage to nerves, specifically the femoral nerve. Given the location of the femoral nerve, indications of dysfunction are centered around the lack of mobility and sensation in lower parts of the legs. The causes of such neuropathy can stem from both direct and indirect injuries, pressures and diseases. Physical examinations are usually first carried out, depending on the high severity of the injury. In the cases of patients with hemorrhage, imaging techniques are used before any physical examination. Another diagnostic method, electrodiagnostic studies, are recognized as the gold standard that is used to confirm the injury of the femoral nerve. After diagnosis, different treatment methods are provided to the patients depending upon their symptoms in order to effectively target the underlying causes. Currently, femoral neuropathy is highly underdiagnosed and its precedent medical history is not well documented worldwide.

== Femoral Nerve ==
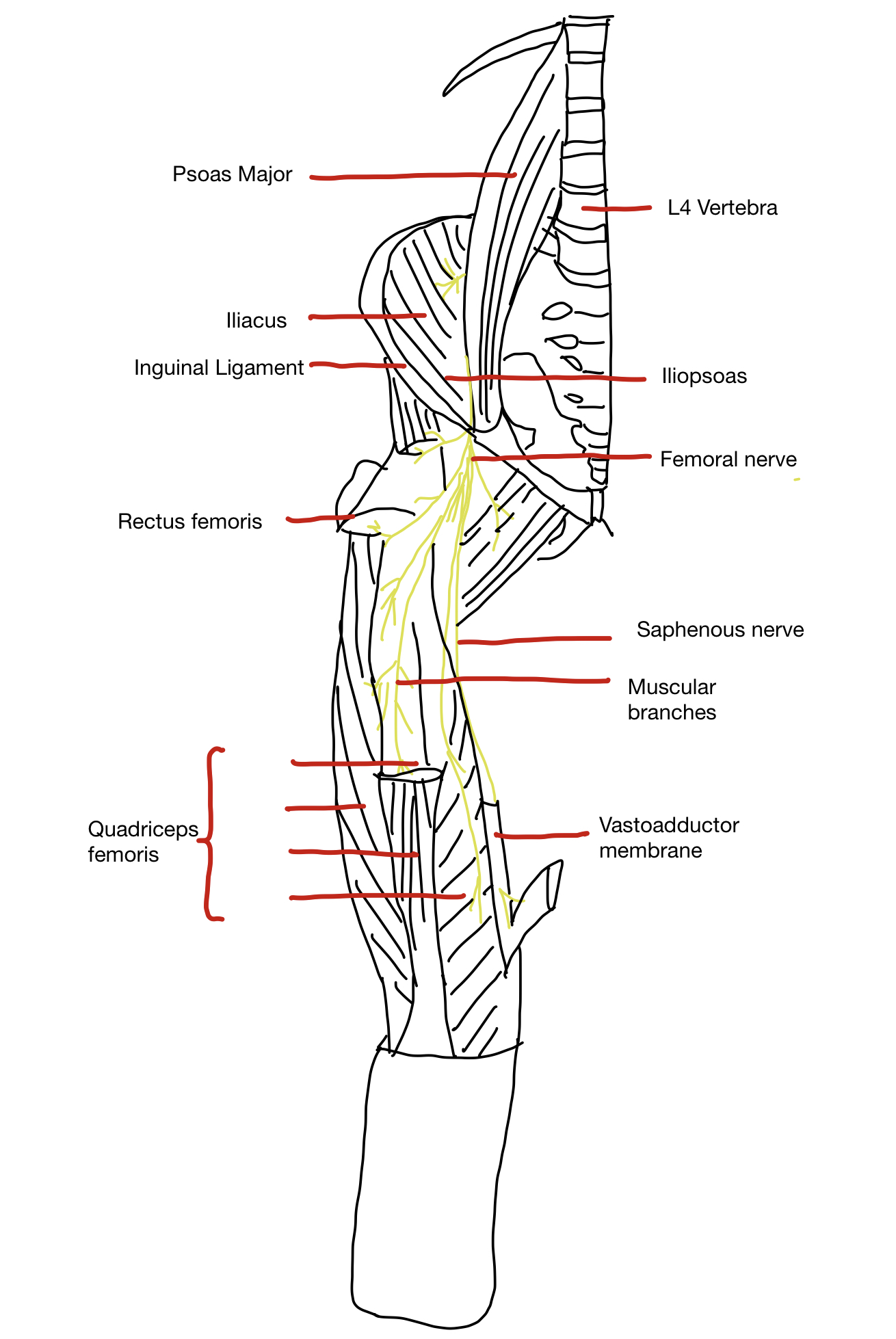
Image of femoral nerve and its innervations of muscles

The femoral nerve is the largest nerve of the lumbar plexus. It is located in the pelvis, and travels down at the front of the leg. The nerve has several branches given its origin from the lumbar spine, down the pelvis and further into the lower spine. Anatomically, it is formed by the dorsal division of the ventral rami of spinal nerves L2-L4, specifically the posterior divisions of the lumbar plexus. The femoral nerve travels posterior to the inguinal ligament within the muscular lacuna which contains the iliopsoas muscle. It travels along with the femoral artery, vein and lymphatics in the femoral triangle which allows the supply of oxygenated blood to maintain its motor and sensory functions. For its motor sensory, the nerve controls the major hip flexor muscles as well as knee extension muscles to allow movement of the hips and straightening of the leg. As for its sensory processing, it has control over the anterior and medial thigh as well as the medial leg down to the hallux, providing sensation to the front of the thigh and part of the lower leg.

== Signs and symptoms ==
Those with femoral nerve dysfunction may present problems of difficulties in movement and a loss of sensation. The patient, in terms of motor skills, may have problems such as quadriceps wasting, loss of knee extension and a lesser extent of hip flexion given the femoral nerve involvement of the iliacus and pectineus muscles. One may experience numbness and tingling in any part of the leg, typically in the front and the inside of one's thighs and down to the feet. They may also experience a dull ache in the genital region given that the inguinal ligament is actually divided into the femoral and genital branches. Feelings of the patient's leg and knees giving out may also be prevalent due to lower extremity muscle weakness and quadriceps weakness. In terms of sensory skills, patients may observe a decrease in sensation over the front and medial sections of the thigh and medial aspects of the lower legs and feet due to their involvement of the anterior and medial cutaneous nerves of the thigh and the saphenous nerve respectively.

== Causes ==
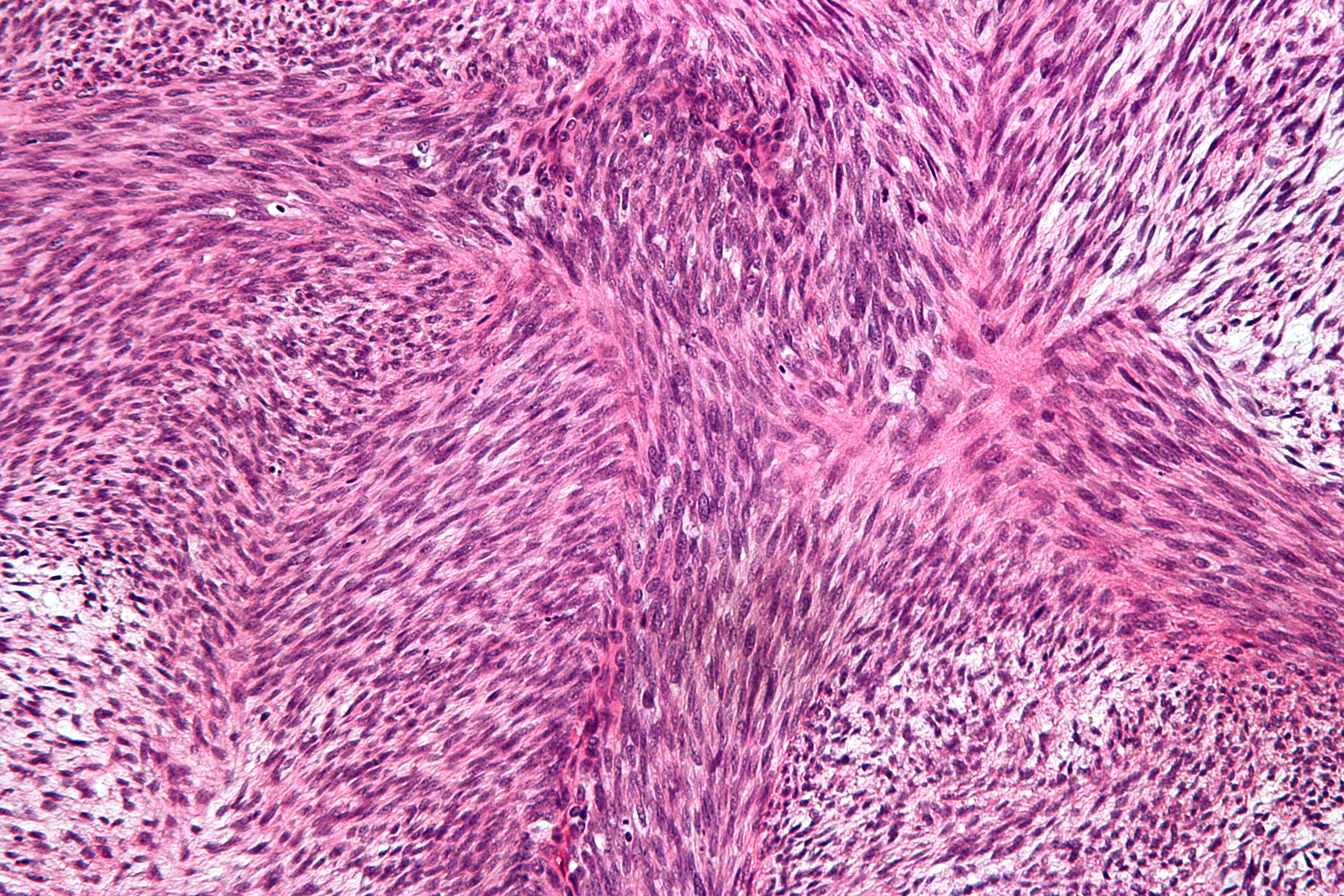
Image of peripheral nerve sheath tumor under microscope

The symptoms of femoral neuropathy are due to either specifically just the femoral nerve or several damaged nerves. This local cause of damage to just the femoral nerve is termed mononeuropathy. Although damage to the femoral nerve is uncommon due to its location, there are numerous risk factors including injuries, prolonged pressure and damage from diseases that can still lead to such neuropathy. These include:

- A direct physical sharp trauma, which is the most common etiology
- A tumor or other growth blocking or trapping part of the nerve
- Intra abdominal, hip and other injuries and operations due to prolonged compression, retraction or stretching of the nerve, such as:
  - Pelvic fracture
  - Pelvic radiation therapy
  - A catheter placed in the femoral artery
  - Proximal interlocking screw placement through femoral IM nailing
  - Growth of masses on the muscles in the thigh
  - Bleeding in the abdomen
  - Tumor or growth on the kidneys
  - Complex anterior and posterior spinal surgery
- Hemorrhage
- Diabetes: most common reason for peripheral neuropathy in people with diabetes for more than 25 years

== Diagnosis ==
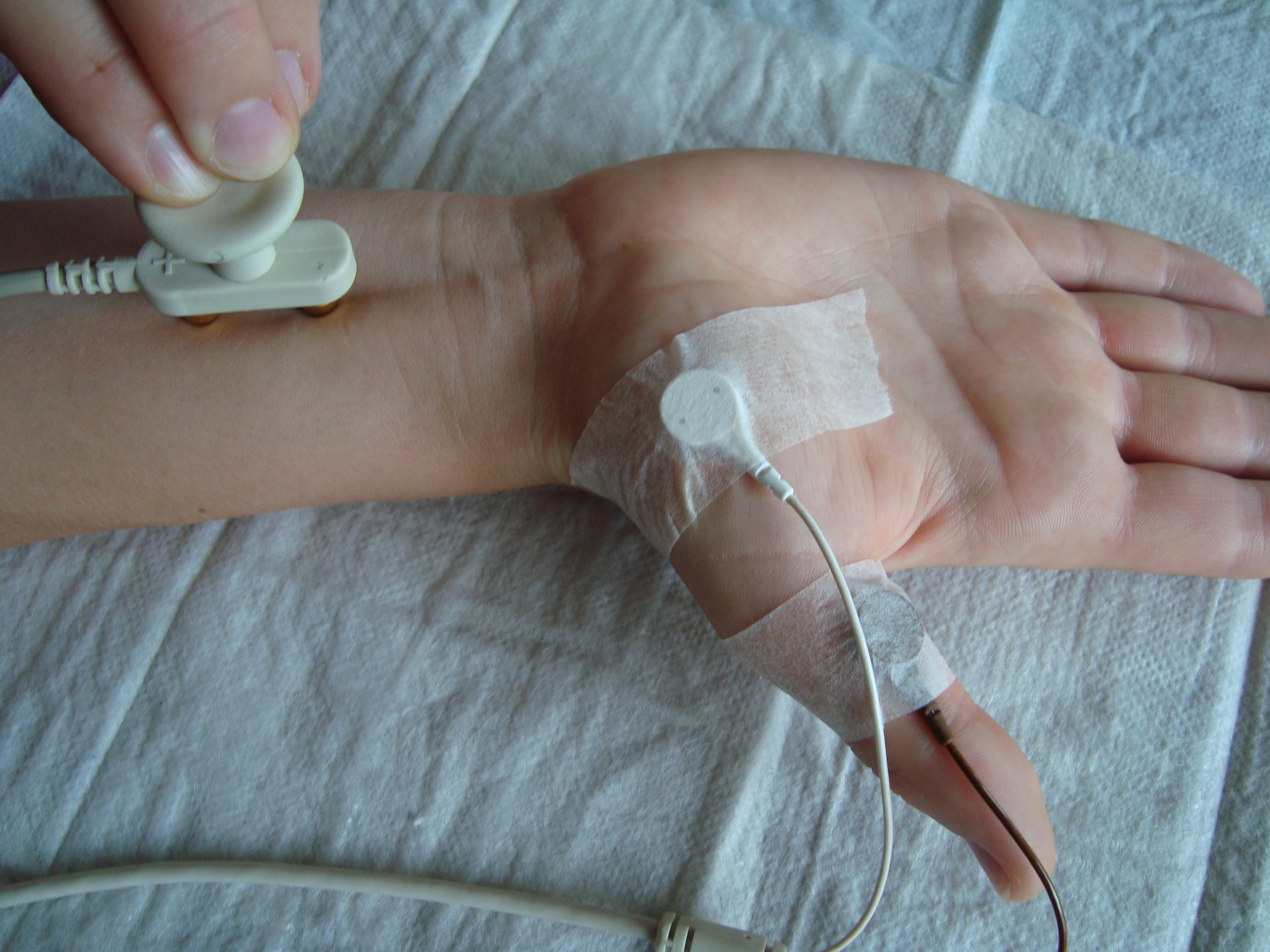
Image showing nerve conduction study which can measure nerve conduction velocity of peripheral nerves

The diagnosis of femoral neuropathy can be done through physical examinations, several imaging techniques and electrodiagnostic studies. Provided patients do not suffer from haemorrhage, physical examinations is the first line of diagnosis. These examinations are carried out in order to evaluate whether nerves of the lower back, lower limbs and hips are functioning well. They can also help determine whether it is strictly an injury in the femoral nerve or a systemic disorder. Other than questioning about possible recent injuries, surgeries, and medical history, inspection of asymmetry or atrophy of the quadriceps muscles, muscle stretch reflexes, and sensory testing through pinpricks and light touches are conducted. By looking at the asymmetry or atrophy of the quadriceps muscles, weaknesses in knee extension or hip flexion can be observed. Furthermore, physicians palpate over the inguinal ligament to inspect the anterior and medial leg, anterior thigh, and quadriceps reflex. In addition, comparison of quadriceps strength to adductor strength help point towards femoral neuropathy. However, given that the diagnosis of femoral neuropathy through physical examination is subject to how severe the injury is, additional imaging testing such as computed tomography, magnetic resonance imaging, ultrasounds and nerve conduction studies and electromyography are also done.

Imaging studies are strongly recommended in case of suspected haemorrhage. First, computed tomography or magnetic resonance imaging is carried out to confirm the presence of a haemorrhage. These scans also can be used to look for tumors, growths, or any masses surrounding the femoral nerve that could lead to compression. Then ultrasound scans can be conducted to localize the femoral nerve using sound waves to create images and identify any injury to the femoral nerve.

In general, electrodiagnostic studies are perceived as the gold standard that diagnoses femoral neuropathy. The studies include nerve conduction studies and electromyography. Nerve conduction looks at the speed of electrical impulses while the conduction studies can localize the damaged femoral nerve, electromyography can evaluate muscles innervated by femoral, tibial, obturator, and peroneal nerves.

== Treatment ==
Treatment for femoral dysfunction comes in several ways depending on the symptoms of the patient. This includes dealing with the underlying causes, lifestyle remedies, medications, physical therapy and surgery. In order to relieve minor symptoms, patients are to deal with the underlying cause and make changes to their lifestyles. For example, if compression on the nerve is the underlying cause, it is important to avoid tight clothing, or activities that can put pressure on the femoral nerve over long periods of time. If diabetes is the underlying condition, patients will need to lose weight or find ways to bring their blood sugar back to normal. However, if the condition still persists, treatments such as medication and physical therapy are required.

In addition to the corticosteroids injection in the leg to reduce inflammation, pain medications are prescribed to alleviate pain. For such neuropathic pains, the most common prescriptions are gabapentin, pregabalin, or amitriptyline. Physical therapy on the other hand, not only helps to build strength in leg muscles, but also helps to reduce pain and promote mobility. Rehabilitation will be focused on areas such as hip abduction, hip rotation and kneeling hip flexor stretch. Moreover, orthopaedic devices may also be given to patients to assist with mobilization. If conservative treatments above still lead to unsuccessful treatment outcomes, surgery, which is more invasive, is the last resort. However, up till now, surgery for femoral neuropathy poses a tough challenge because there have been no cases of complete functional recovery despite the microsurgical equipment development.

== Epidemiology ==
Femoral nerve dysfunction is classified under peripheral neuropathy. Although the prevalence of peripheral neuropathy is known to increase with age, medical reports of the peripheral neuropathy diagnosis are still not well documented and highly underdiagnosed. For this reason, there is no epidemiological study that can accurately estimate its global prevalence. The figures of epidemiological studies regarding peripheral neuropathy vary to a great extent depending on the literature source, as available data sources does not focus on the general population. However, as an estimation, there are roughly 2-7% individuals worldwide are affected by peripheral neuropathy. It is also found that peripheral neuropathy is more common in Western countries when compared to developing countries.
