= Tensor muscle =

A tensor muscle has the function of tensing (stretching or tightening) a part and may refer to:

- Tensor fasciae latae muscle
- Tensor tympani muscle
- Tensor vastus intermedius muscle
- Tensor veli palatini muscle
