= Vastus medialis =

Extensor muscle located medially in the thigh that extends the knee

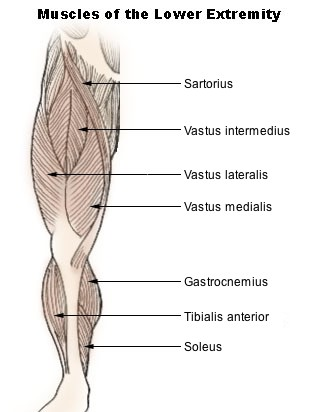
- Muscles of lower extremity (Rectus Femoris has been removed)

Details
- Origin: Medial side of femur
- Insertion: Quadriceps tendon
- Artery: Femoral artery
- Nerve: Femoral nerve
- Actions: Extends knee

Identifiers
- Latin: musculus vastus medialis or musculus vastus internus
- TA98: A04.7.02.023
- TA2: 2620
- FMA: 22432

The vastus medialis (vastus internus or teardrop muscle) is an extensor muscle located medially in the thigh that extends the knee. The vastus medialis is part of the quadriceps muscle group.

== Structure ==
The vastus medialis is a muscle present in the anterior compartment of thigh, and is one of the four muscles that make up the quadriceps muscle. The others are the vastus lateralis, vastus intermedius and rectus femoris. It is the most medial of the "vastus" group of muscles. The vastus medialis arises medially along the entire length of the femur, and attaches with the other muscles of the quadriceps in the quadriceps tendon.

The vastus medialis muscle originates from a continuous line of attachment on the femur, which begins on the front and middle side (anteromedially) on the intertrochanteric line of the femur. It continues down and back (posteroinferiorly) along the pectineal line and then descends along the inner (medial) lip of the linea aspera and onto the medial supracondylar line of the femur. The fibers converge onto the inner (medial) part of the quadriceps tendon and the inner (medial) border of the patella.

The obliquus genus muscle is the most distal segment of the vastus medialis muscle. Its specific training plays an important role in maintaining patella position and limiting injuries to the knee. With no clear delineation, it is simply the most distal group of fibers of the vastus medialis.

== Function ==
The vastus medialis is one of four muscles in the anterior compartment of the thigh. It is involved in knee extension, along with the other muscles which make up the quadriceps muscle. The vastus medialis also contributes to correct tracking of the patella.

A division of the vastus medialis muscle into two groups of fibers has been hypothesized, a long and relatively inline group of fibres with the quadriceps ligament, the vastus medialis longus; and a shorter and more obliquely oriented with group of fibres, the vastus medialis obliquus. There is as yet insufficient evidence to conclusively confirm or deny this hypothesis.

== Clinical significance ==
=== Knee pain ===
Knee pain is thought to be primarily associated with specific quadriceps muscle weakness or fatigue, especially in the vastus medialis obliquus (VMO). It is known that fatigue can be caused by many different mechanisms, ranging from the accumulation of metabolites within muscle fibers to the generation of an inadequate motor command in the motor cortex. Characteristics of the vastus medialis, including its angle of insertion, correlate with presence of knee joint pain (patellofemoral pain syndrome). However, this syndrome is complex and definitive evidence of causality has not yet been published.

Misfiring and fatiguing of the VMO causes mal-tracking of the patella and subsequent damage to surrounding structures creating increased force on the knees, often resulting in injuries such as patellofemoral pain syndrome, anterior cruciate ligament rupture, chondromalacia, and tendinitis. Through the use of electromyography, researchers can evaluate and record the electrical activity produced by the skeletal muscle of the VMO to analyze the biomechanics and detect any possible abnormalities, weakness, or fatigue. With an analysis of muscle activity of the VMO through the use of electromyography, proper rehabilitative plans and goals can be established to not only correct the already established abnormality, but even prevent such injuries if tested sooner. Preventing injuries is crucial as well as teaching proper training techniques to ensure there are no valgus collapse forces causing unplanned stress on other structures of the knee, causing asymmetry, and predisposing that individual for injury.

== Additional images ==
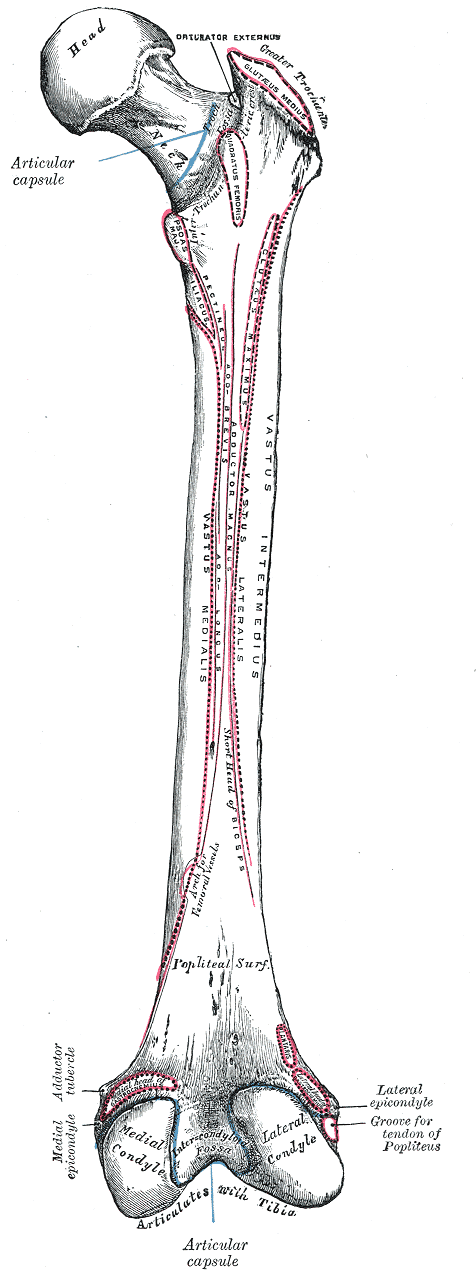
Right femur. Posterior surface.

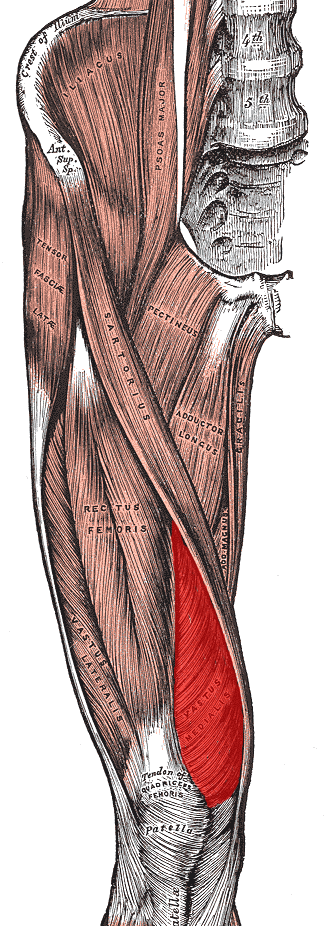
Muscles of the iliac and anterior femoral regions.

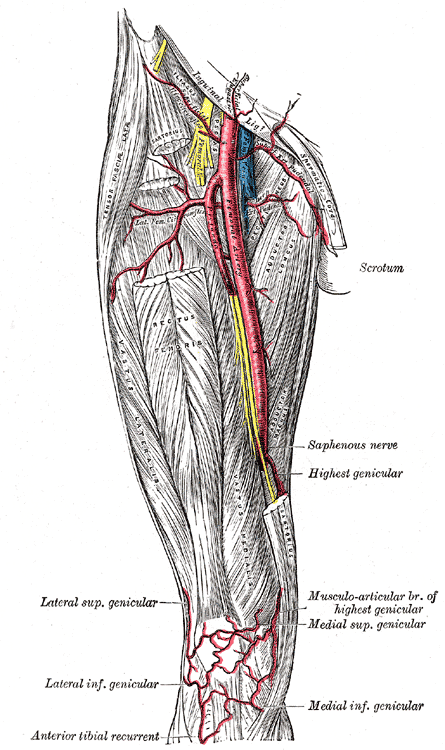
The femoral artery.

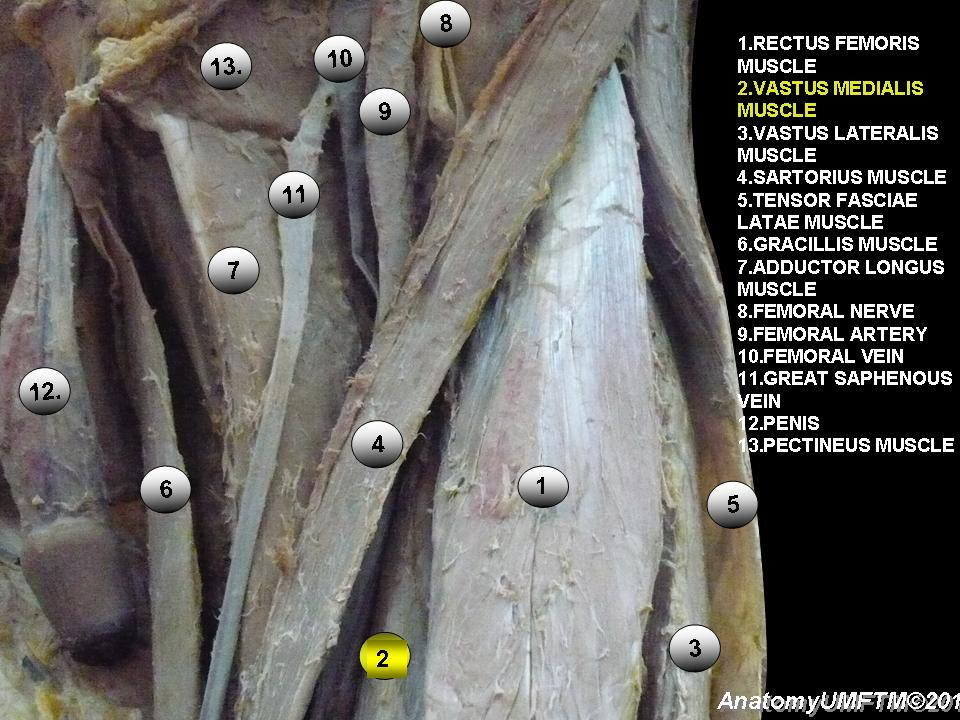
Vastus medialis

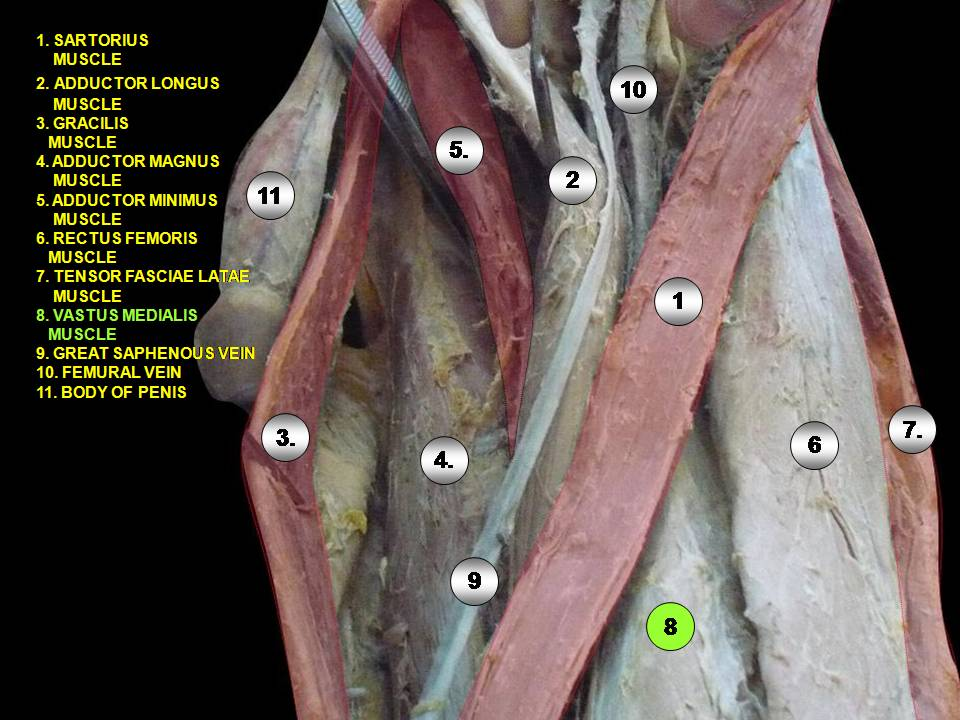
Vastus medialis muscle

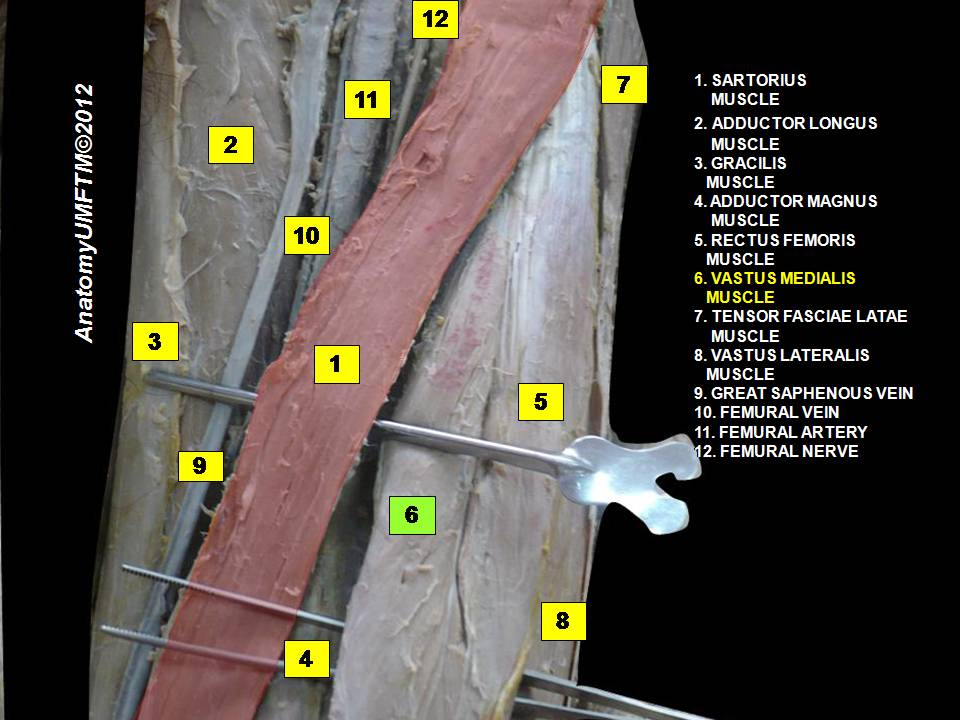
Vastus medialis muscle

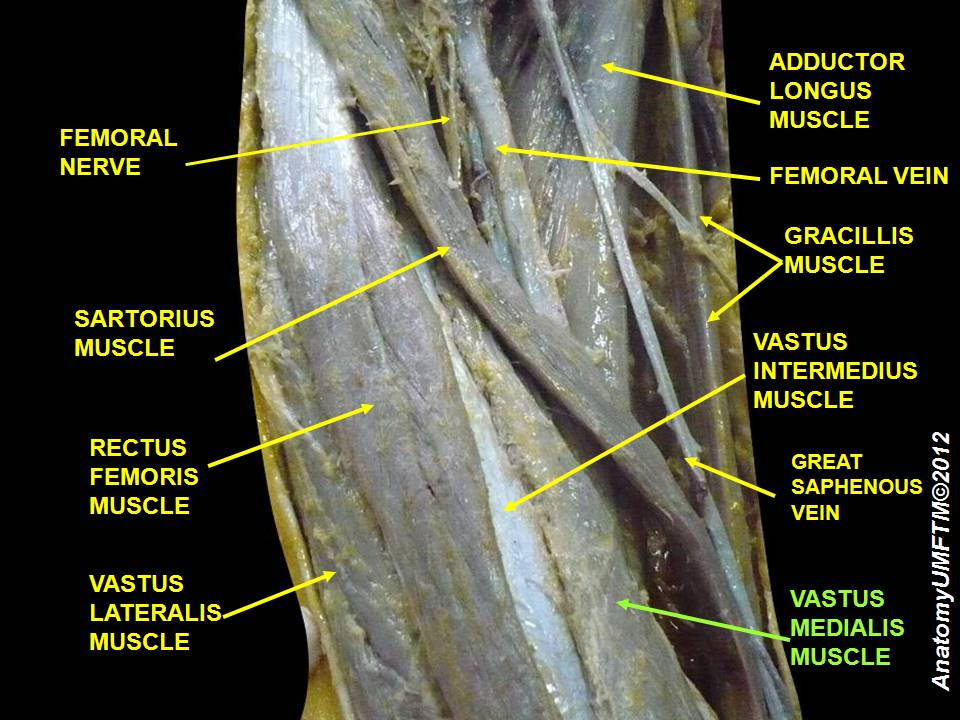
Vastus medialis muscle

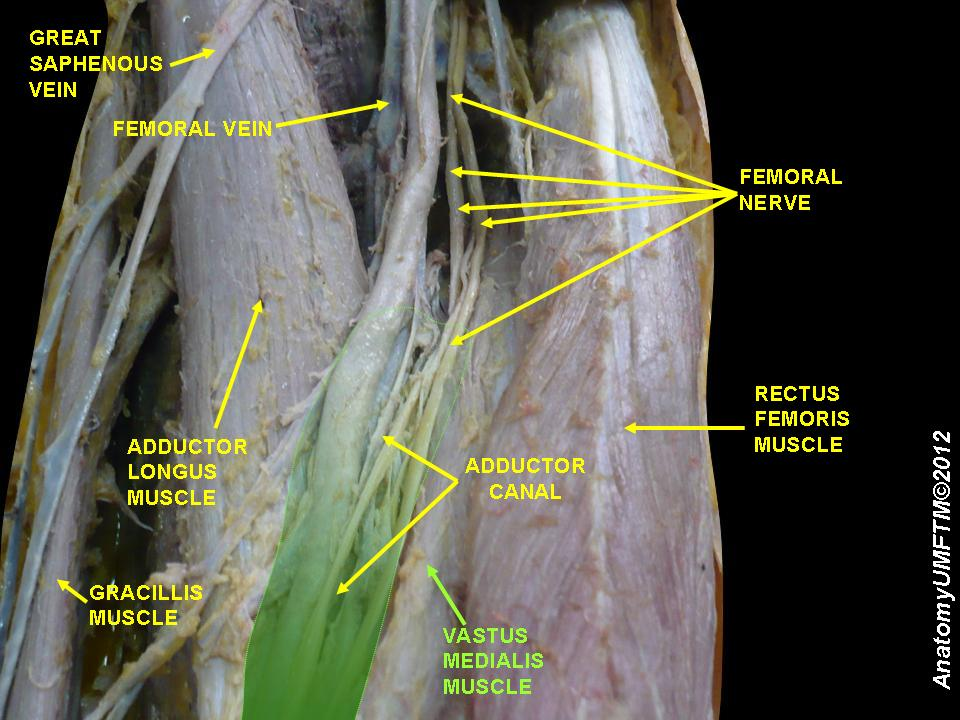
Vastus medialis muscle

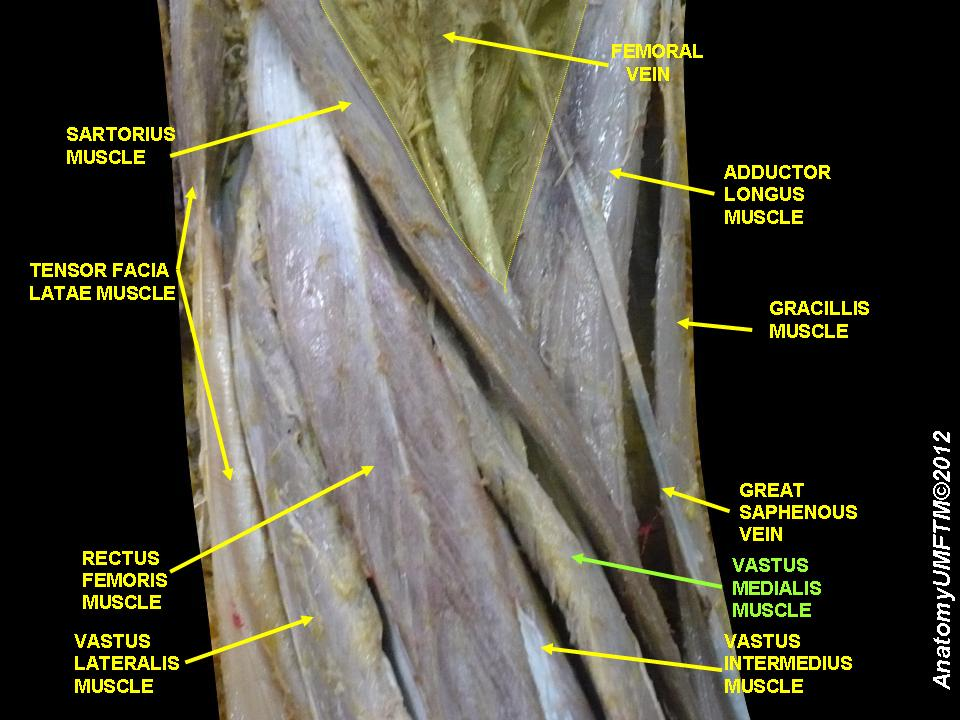
Vastus medialis muscle

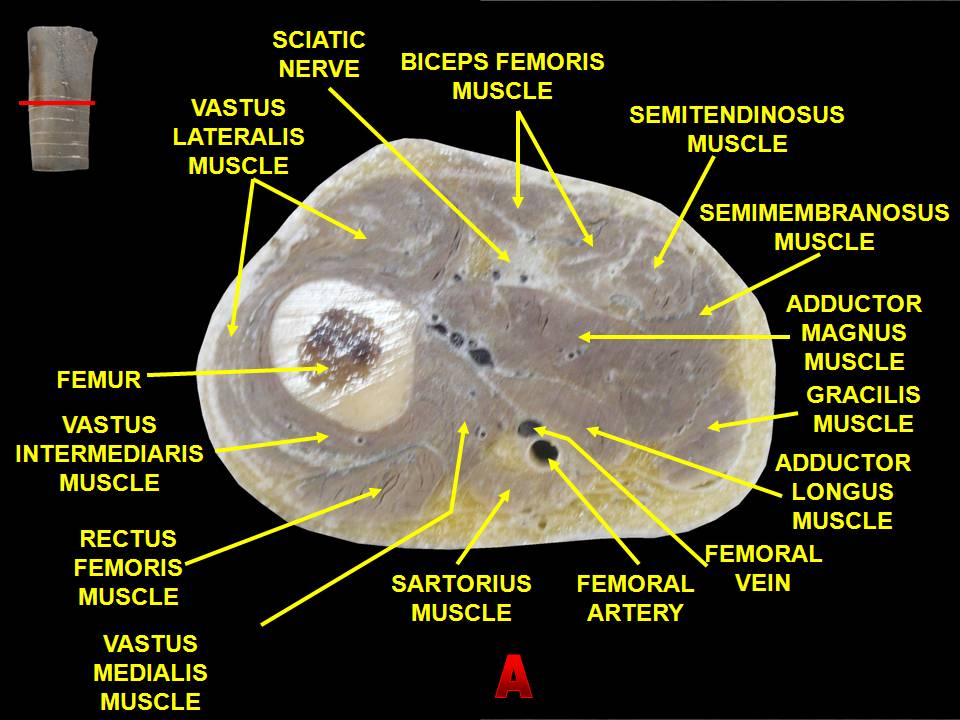
Muscles of thigh. Cross section.

== See also ==
- Medial patellofemoral ligament
