= Quadriceps =

Group of human leg muscle

Quadriceps femoris muscle
- Quadriceps femoris, with different muscles in different colors. rectus femoris vastus lateralis vastus intermedius vastus medialis

Details
- Origin: Combined rectus femoris and vastus muscles
- Insertion: Tibial tuberosity
- Artery: Femoral artery
- Nerve: Femoral nerve
- Actions: Knee extension; hip flexion (rectus femoris only)

Identifiers
- Latin: musculus quadriceps femoris
- MeSH: D052097
- TA98: A04.7.02.017
- TA2: 2613
- FMA: 22428

The quadriceps femoris muscle (/ˈkwɒdrɪsɛps ˈfɛmərɪs/, also called the quadriceps extensor, quadriceps or quads) is a large muscle group that includes the four prevailing muscles on the front of the thigh. It is the sole extensor muscle of the knee, forming a large fleshy mass which covers the front and sides of the femur. The name derives from Latin four-headed muscle of the femur.

== Structure ==
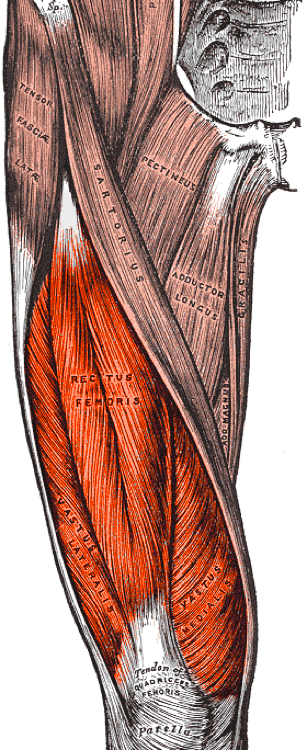
The quadriceps consists of four separate muscles(vastus intermedius muscle is not shown as it is deep to rectus femoris muscle)

=== Parts ===
The quadriceps femoris muscle is subdivided into four separate muscles (the 'heads'), with the first superficial to the other three over the femur (from the trochanters to the condyles):

- The rectus femoris muscle occupies the middle of the thigh, covering most of the other three quadriceps muscles. It originates on the ilium. It is named for its straight course.
- The vastus lateralis muscle is on the lateral side of the femur (i.e., on the outer side of the thigh).
- The vastus medialis muscle is on the medial side of the femur (i.e., on the inner side of the thigh).
- The vastus intermedius muscle lies between vastus lateralis and vastus medialis on the front of the femur (i.e., on the top or front of the thigh), but deep to the rectus femoris muscle. Typically, it cannot be seen without dissection of the rectus femoris.

=== Attachments ===
The rectus femoris arises from the anterior inferior iliac spine and from the superior edge of the acetabulum. It is thus a biarticular muscle. The other parts of the quadriceps arise from the surface of the femur. All four parts of the quadriceps muscle ultimately insert into the tuberosity of the tibia via the patella, where the quadriceps tendon becomes the patellar tendon.

=== Other muscles ===
There is a small fifth muscle of the quadriceps complex—the articularis genus muscle—that is not often included.

In addition, cadaver studies have confirmed the presence of a sixth muscle, the tensor vastus intermedius. While this muscle has a variable presentation, it consistently originates at the proximal femur, runs between the vastus lateralis and vastus intermedius muscles, and inserts distally at the medial aspect of the patellar base. Historically considered a part of the vastus lateralis muscle, the tensor vastus intermedius muscle is innervated by an independent branch of the femoral nerve and its tendinous belly can be separated from the vasti lateralis and intermedius muscles in most cases.

=== Innervation ===
The quadriceps femoris is innervated by the femoral nerve, which originates from L2, L3, L4.

== Function ==
All four quadriceps are powerful extensors of the knee joint. They are crucial in walking, running, jumping and squatting. Because the rectus femoris attaches to the ilium, it is also a flexor of the hip. This action is also crucial to walking or running, as it swings the leg forward into the ensuing step. The quadriceps, specifically the vastus medialis, play the important role of stabilizing the patella and the knee joint during gait.

== Clinical significance ==
The quadriceps femoris muscle is a target for manual therapy and physical therapy from repetitive strain injuries, such as from skiing.

The quadriceps femoris muscle is the most common site of myositis ossificans.

== Society and culture ==
=== Training ===
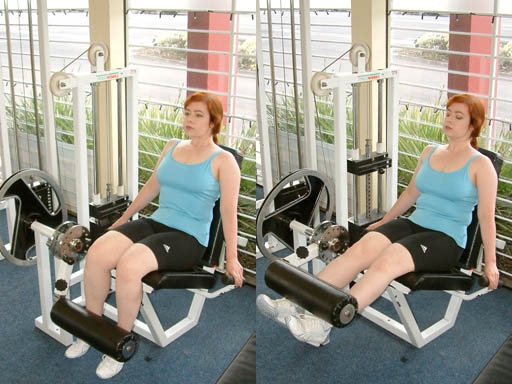
The leg extension is an isolation exercise for the quadriceps.

In strength training, the quadriceps are trained by several leg exercises including the squat, leg press, and leg extension.

== Etymology ==
The proper Latin plural form of the adjective quadriceps would be quadricipites. In modern English usage, quadriceps is used in both the singular and plural form. The singular form quadricep, produced by back-formation, is frequently used.

== Additional images ==
The quadriceps tendon connects to the top part of the kneecap (patella)

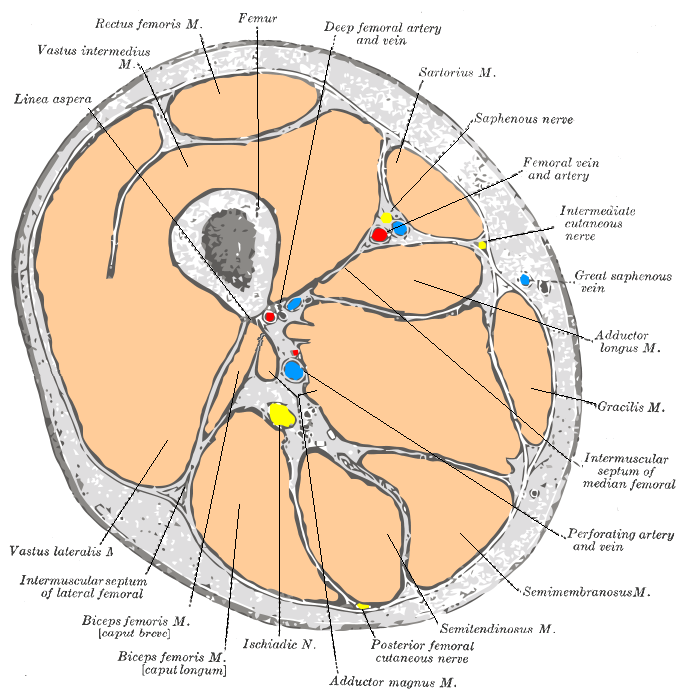
Cross-section through the middle of the thigh

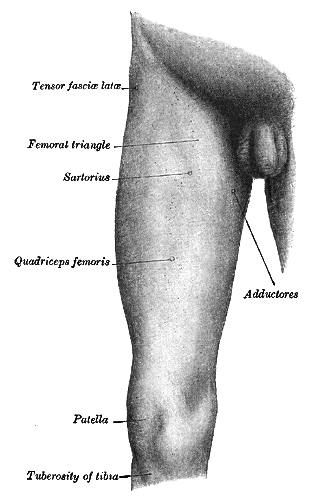
The quadriceps forms the bulk of front part of the thigh

== See also ==
- Hamstring
- Gluteal muscles
