= Femoral nerve =

Long nerve down the thigh and inner leg

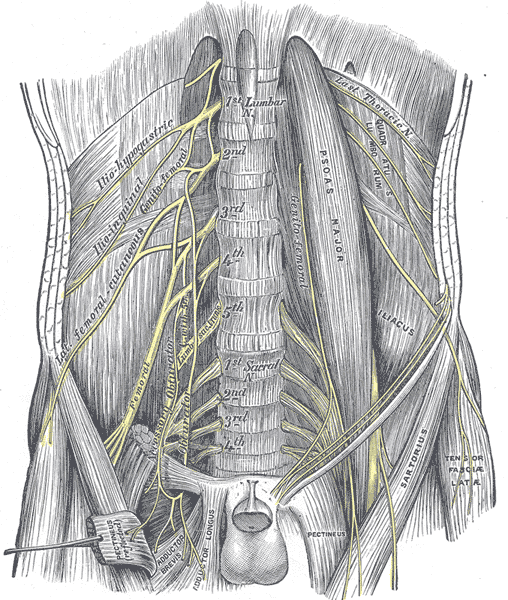
- The lumbar plexus and its branches. (Femoral labeled at bottom left.)

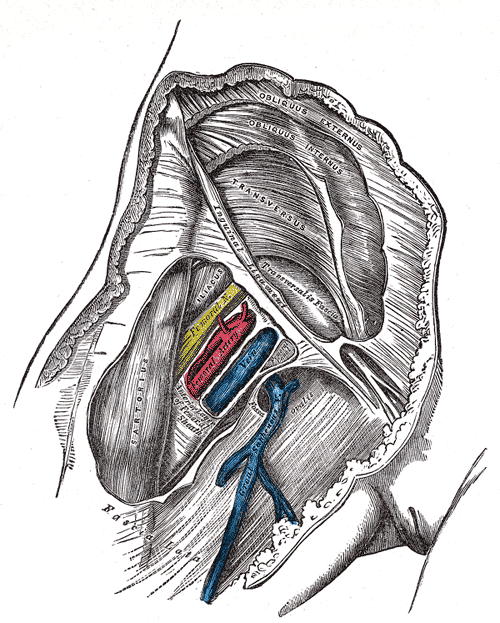
- Femoral sheath laid open to show its three compartments. (Femoral nerve visible in yellow.)

Details
- From: L2
- To: L4
- Innervates: Anterior compartment of thigh

Identifiers
- Latin: nervus femoralis
- MeSH: D005267
- TA98: A14.2.07.020
- TA2: 6522
- FMA: 16486

The femoral nerve is a nerve in the thigh that supplies skin on the upper thigh and inner leg, and the muscles that extend the knee. It is the largest branch of the lumbar plexus.

== Structure ==
The femoral nerve is the major nerve supplying the anterior compartment of the thigh. It is the largest branch of the lumbar plexus, and arises from the dorsal divisions of the ventral rami of the second, third, and fourth lumbar nerves (L2, L3, and L4).

The nerve enters the femoral triangle by passing beneath the inguinal ligament, just lateral to the femoral artery. In the thigh, the nerve lies in a groove between iliacus muscle and psoas major muscle, outside the femoral sheath, and lateral to the femoral artery. After a short course of about 4 cm in the thigh, the nerve is divided into anterior and posterior divisions, separated by lateral femoral circumflex artery. The branches are shown below:

=== Muscular branches ===
- The nerve to the pectineus muscle arises immediately above the inguinal ligament from the medial side of the femoral nerve, and passes behind the femoral sheath to enter the anterior surface of the muscle.
- Anterior division supplies the sartorius muscle
- Posterior division supplies the rectus femoris muscle, the three vastus muscles – (vastus medialis, vastus lateralis, and vastus intermedius), and the articularis genus muscle. The articularis genus is supplied by a branch of the nerve to vastus intermedius.

=== Cutaneous branches ===
- The anterior division gives off anterior cutaneous branches: The anterior cutaneous branches are: the intermediate femoral cutaneous nerve and the medial femoral cutaneous nerve.
- The posterior division gives off only one branch, which is the saphenous nerve.

=== Articular branches ===
- Hip joint is supplied by the nerve to the rectus femoris.
- Knee joint is supplied by the nerves to the three vastus muscles. The nerve to vastus medialis is particularly thick because it contains the proprioceptive fibres from the knee joint. This is in accordance to the Hilton's law.

=== Vascular branches ===
- Branches to the femoral artery and its branches.

== Clinical significance ==
Signals from the femoral nerve and its branches can be blocked to interrupt the transmission of pain signals from the innervation area. Some of the nerve blocks that work by affecting the femoral nerve are the femoral nerve block, the fascia iliac block and the 3-in-1 nerve block. Femoral nerve blocks are very effective.

During pelvic surgery and abdominal surgery, the femoral nerve must be identified early on to protect it from iatrogenic nerve injury.

The femoral nerve stretch test can be performed to identify the compression of spinal nerve roots. The test is positive if thigh pain increases.

== Additional images ==
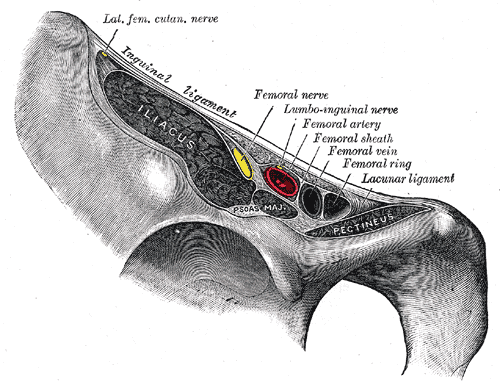
Structures passing behind the right inguinal ligament

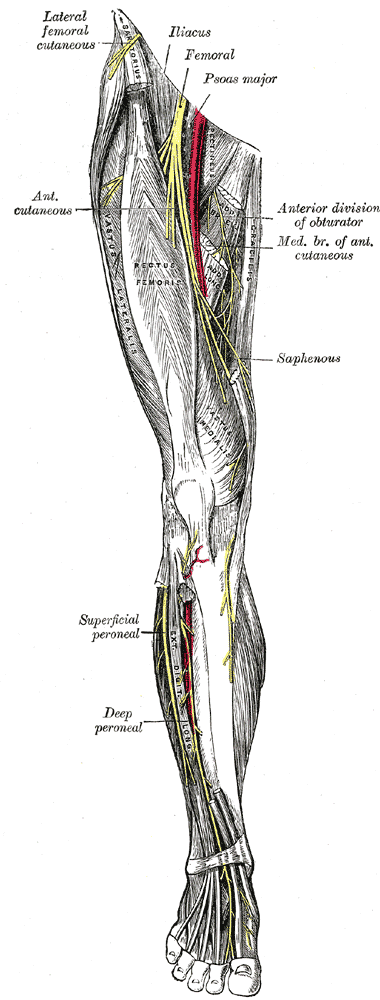
Nerves of the right leg.

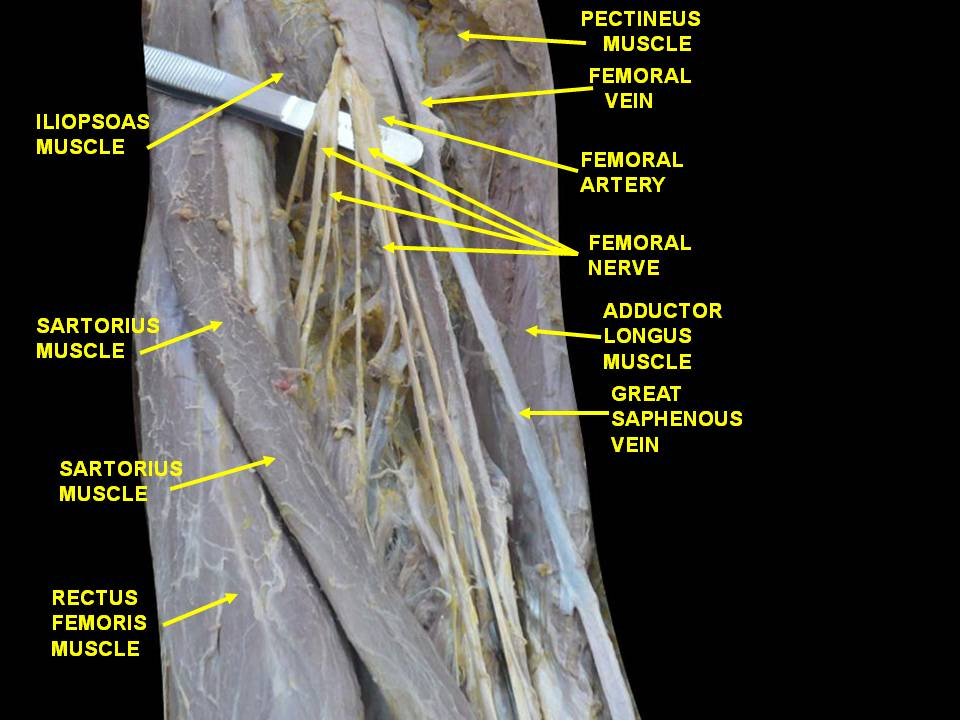
Femoral nerve.Deep dissection.

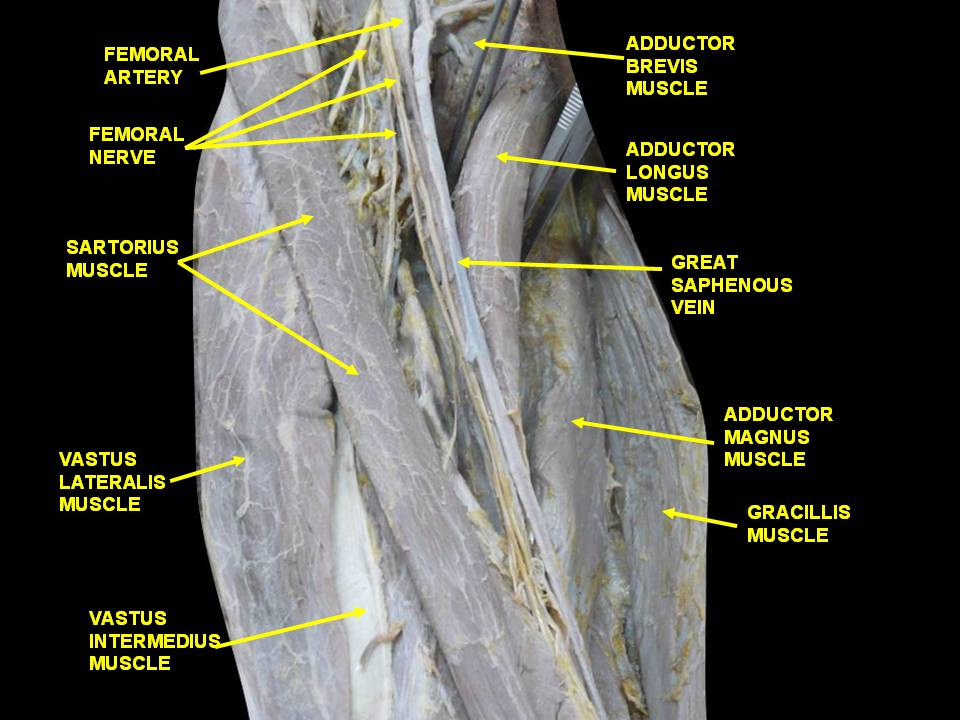
Femoral nerve.Deep dissection.

== See also ==
- Femoral nerve stretch test
- Femoral nerve dysfunction
