= Patellar tendon =

Tendon in the human knee

Patellar ligament
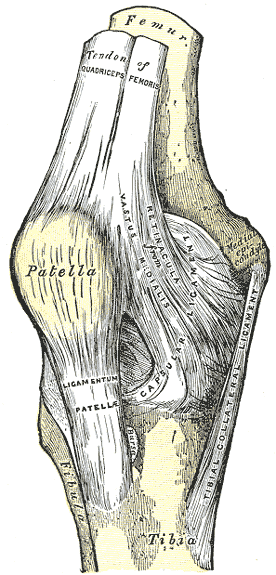
- Right knee-joint. Anterior view. (Ligamentum patellae visible at bottom left, below patella.)

Details
- From: Patella
- To: Tuberosity of the tibia

Identifiers
- Latin: ligamentum patellae
- MeSH: D017847
- TA98: A03.6.08.015
- TA2: 2622
- FMA: 44581

The patellar tendon is the distal portion of the common tendon of the quadriceps femoris, which is continued from the patella to the tibial tuberosity. It is also sometimes called the patellar ligament as it forms a bone to bone connection when the patella is fully ossified.

== Structure ==
The patellar tendon is a strong, flat ligament, which originates on the apex of the patella distally and adjoining margins of the patella and the rough depression on its posterior surface; below, it inserts on the tuberosity of the tibia; its superficial fibers are continuous over the front of the patella with those of the tendon of the quadriceps femoris. It is about 4.5 cm long in adults (range from 3 to 6 cm).

The medial and lateral portions of the quadriceps tendon pass down on either side of the patella to be inserted into the upper extremity of the tibia on either side of the tuberosity; these portions merge into the capsule, as stated above, forming the medial and lateral patellar retinacula.

The posterior surface of the patellar tendon is separated from the synovial membrane of the joint by a large infrapatellar pad of fat, and from the tibia by a bursa.

== Clinical significance ==
The patellar tendon can be injured in a patellar tendon rupture. Because tendons do not regenerate fully in humans, there is a significant clinical need for research into therapies for patellar tendon rupture.

It can be used as a tissue source in the repair of other ligaments. In the event of a torn anterior cruciate ligament, the patellar tendon can be used in the rehabilitation process. In this case, the middle one third of the patellar tendon is harvested and inserted through tunnels that are drilled into the femur and tibia. The portion of the patellar tendon is then drawn through these tunnels in the bone and will be affixed to the bone via screws. The recovery process takes approximately 4–6 months upon the completion of surgery. This patellar tendon method of reconstruction was traditionally the gold standard graft for anterior cruciate ligament reconstruction and is still one of the more preferred methods.

The insertion of the patellar tendon on the tibia is the location of Osgood–Schlatter disease.

== See also ==
- Patellar reflex
- Patellar tendinitis

== Additional images ==
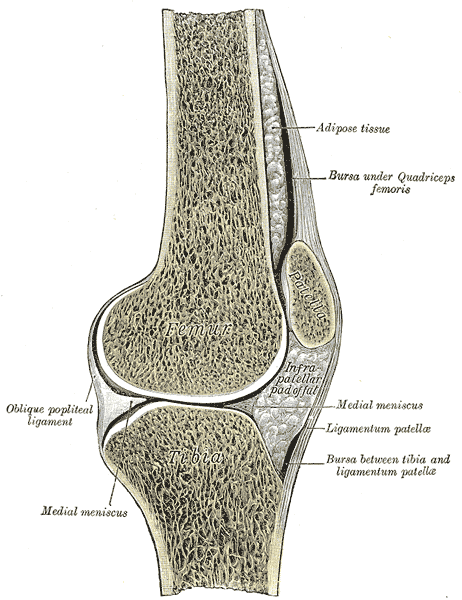
Sagittal section of right knee-joint.

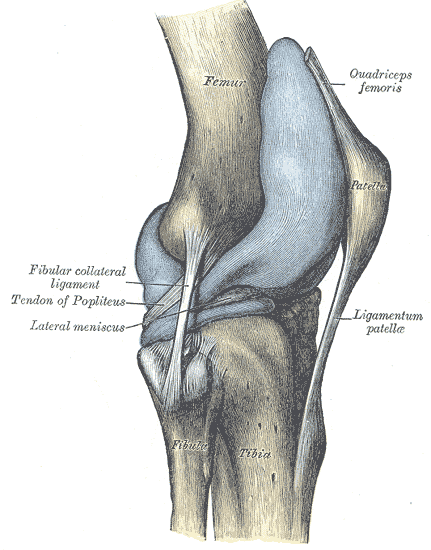
Capsule of right knee-joint (distended). Lateral aspect.
