= Vastus lateralis muscle =

Human muscle in the thigh

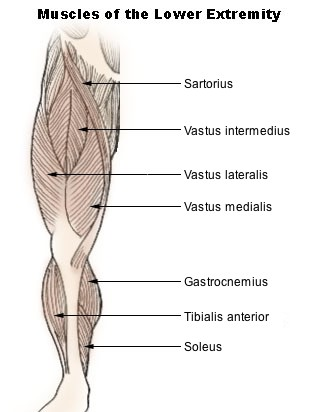
- Muscles of lower extremity (rectus femoris has been removed)

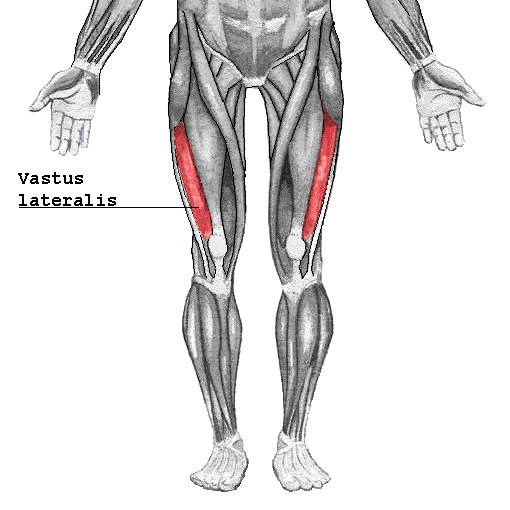
- Vastus lateralis

Details
- Origin: Greater trochanter, intertrochanteric line, and linea aspera of the femur
- Insertion: Patella by the quadriceps tendon and tibial tuberosity by the patellar ligament
- Artery: Lateral circumflex femoral artery
- Nerve: Femoral nerve
- Actions: Extends and stabilizes knee
- Antagonist: Hamstring

Identifiers
- Latin: musculus vastus lateralis or musculus vastus externus
- TA98: A04.7.02.021
- TA2: 2618
- FMA: 22431

The vastus lateralis (/ˈvæstəs ˌlætəˈreɪlɪs, ˈræ-/), also called the vastus externus, is the largest and most powerful part of the quadriceps femoris, a muscle in the thigh. Together with other muscles of the quadriceps group, it serves to extend the knee joint, moving the lower leg forward. It arises from a series of flat, broad tendons attached to the femur, and attaches to the outer border of the patella. It ultimately joins with the other muscles that make up the quadriceps in the quadriceps tendon, which travels over the knee to connect to the tibia. The vastus lateralis is the recommended site for intramuscular injection in infants less than 7 months old and those unable to walk, with loss of muscular tone.

== Structure ==
The vastus lateralis muscle arises from several areas of the femur, including the upper part of the intertrochanteric line; the lower, anterior borders of the greater trochanter, to the outer border of the gluteal tuberosity, and the upper half of the outer border of the linea aspera. These form an aponeurosis, a broad flat tendon that covers the upper three-quarters of the muscle. From the inner surface of the aponeurosis, many muscle fibers originate. Some additional fibers arise from the tendon of the gluteus maximus muscle, and from the septum between the vastus lateralis and short head of the biceps femoris.

The fibers form a large fleshy mass, attached to a second strong aponeurosis, placed on the deep surface of the lower part of the muscle. This lower aponeurosis becomes contracted and thickened into a flat tendon that attaches to the outer border of the patella, and subsequently joins with the quadriceps femoris tendon, expanding the capsule of the knee-joint.

=== Innervation ===
The vastus lateralis muscle is innervated by the muscular branches of the femoral nerve (L2, L3, and L4).

== Additional images ==
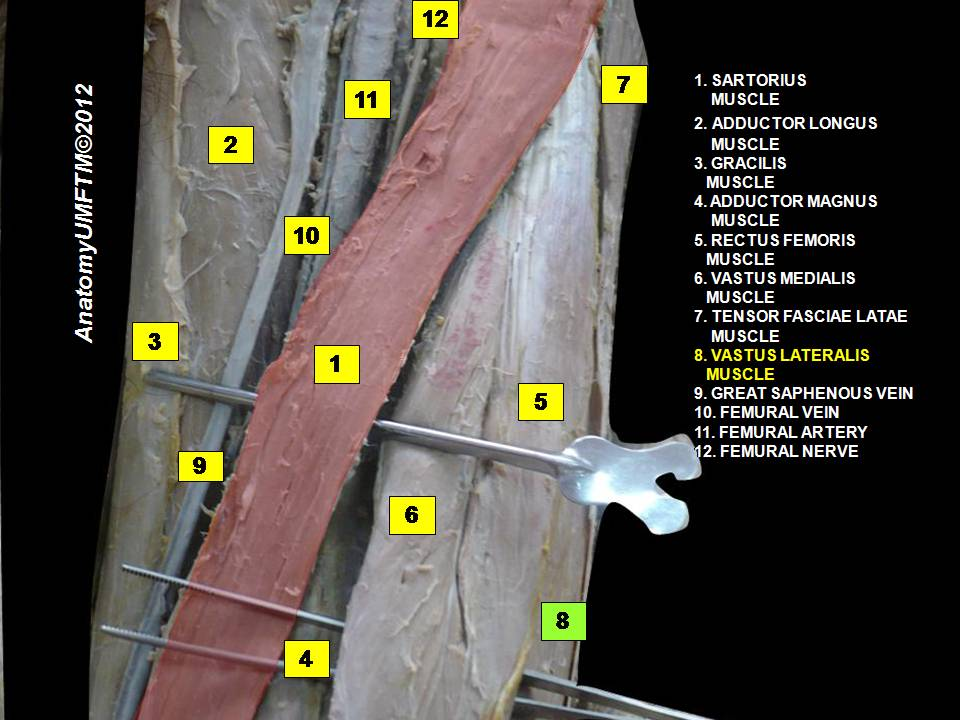
Vastus lateralis muscle

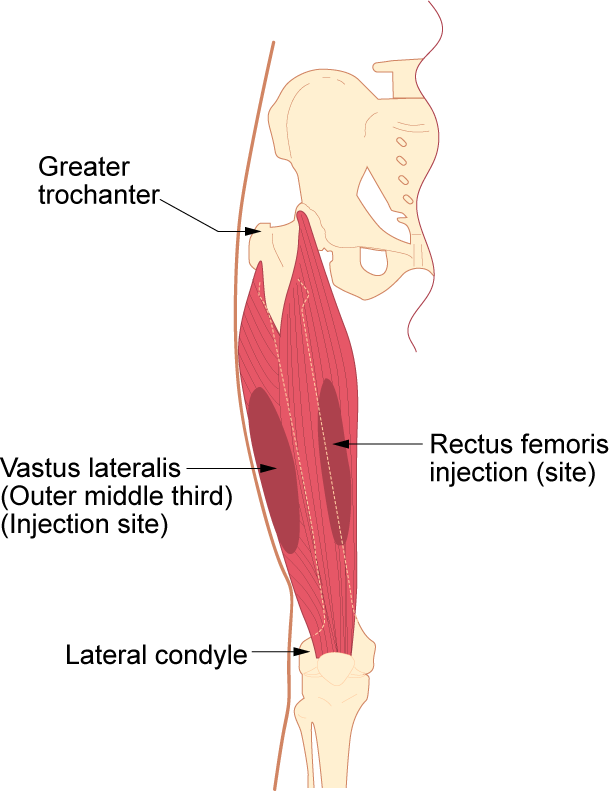
Site for intramuscular injection into the vastus lateralis
