= Quadriceps tendon =

Tendon of the leg

- Right knee

Details
- Location: Front of the knee
- Origin: All four quadriceps muscles
- Insertion: patella
- Articulations: extends the lower leg

Identifiers
- Latin: tendo quadriceps
- TA2: 2621
- FMA: 46900

In human anatomy, the quadriceps tendon works with the quadriceps muscle to extend the leg. All four parts of the quadriceps muscle attach to the shin via the patella (knee cap), where the quadriceps tendon becomes the patellar ligament. It attaches the quadriceps to the top of the patella, which in turn is connected to the shin from its bottom by the patellar ligament. A tendon connects muscle to bone, while a ligament connects bone to bone.

Injuries are common to this tendon, with tears, either partial or complete, being the most common. If the quadriceps tendon is completely torn, surgery will be required to regain function of the knee. Without the quadriceps tendon, the knee cannot extend. Often, when the tendon is completely torn, part of the kneecap bone will break off with the tendon as well. It can rupture resulting in quadriceps tendon rupture.

It has been studied in the analysis of patellofemoral pain syndrome.
