= Brace (surname) =

Brace is a surname. Notable people with the surname include:

- John Brace (MP) (born c. 1578), English Member of Parliament
- Adam Brace (born 1980), English playwright
- Andrew Brace (born 1988), former Belgian rugby union referee
- Ashley Brace (born 1991), Welsh boxer
- Cadence Brace (born 2005), Canadian tennis player
- C. Loring Brace (1930–2019), American professor of anthropology
- Charles Loring Brace (1826–1890), American philanthropist
- Danika Brace (born 1988), American football coach and former player
- David Onllwyn Brace (1848–1891), Welsh minister
- Deryn Brace (born 1975), Welsh former footballer
- DeWitt Bristol Brace (1859–1905), American physicist
- Donald Brace (1881–1955), American publisher
- Edward Brace (1770–1843), Rear Admiral of the British Royal Navy
- Ernest C. Brace (1931–2014), American former soldier, POW in Vietnam
- Gerald Warner Brace (1901–1978), American writer, educator, sailor and boat builder
- Henry Charles Brace, American politician
- Hilary Brace (born 1956), American artist
- Ivor Llewellyn Brace (died 1952), British colonial judge
- Jeffrey Brace (died 1827), born c. 1742, a free African later captured and sold into slavery
- Jennie Brace (1855–1925), English social reformer and writer
- Joab Brace (1781–1861), American minister
- John Thurlow Brace (1685–?), British landowner and politician
- Jonathan Brace (1754–1837), United States Representative from Connecticut
- Julia Brace (1807–1884), deaf and blind woman who learned tactile American Sign Language
- Mike Brace (born 1950), paralympic skier, social worker, and leader of disabled charities
- Onllwyn Brace (1932–2013), Wales rugby union captain
- Peter Brace (1924–2018), British film actor and stunt performer
- Rick Brace, president of the CTV television network
- Robbie Brace (born 1964), English former footballer for Tottenham Hotspur
- Ron Brace (1986–2016), American NFL player
- Steve Brace (born 1961), Welsh former long-distance runner
- Stuart Brace (born 1942), English former footballer
- Thomas Kimberly Brace (1779–1860), American insurance executive and politician
- William Brace (1865–1947), British Member of Parliament and Under-Secretary of State for the Home Department
- William Francis Brace (1926–2012), American geophysicist
- Richard J. Brace (Died 1944), American fighter pilot during World War II, shot down and killed in Niece, France
- Richard J. Brace II (Born 1943), former VP of Pepsi Bottling Group

== See also ==
- Brace (disambiguation)
- DJ Brace
