= Lateral support =

Lateral support may mean:

- Lateral support, a type of support (structure) to help prevent sideways movement
- Lateral and subjacent support, a legal term

== See also ==
- Lateral (disambiguation)
- Support (disambiguation)
