= Bilat =

Bilat may refer to:

- Bilat (India), a village in East Siang district, Arunachal Pradesh, India
- Bilat Paswan Vihangam (1940–2017), Indian writer and politician
- Bilat Pyan Than (1908–2007), Burmese singer and civil servant

== See also ==
- Bilateral (disambiguation)
