= Brace =

Brace(s) or brace may refer to:

== Medical ==
- Orthopaedic brace, a device used to restrict or assist body movement
  - Back brace, a device limiting motion of the spine
    - Milwaukee brace, a kind of back brace used in the treatment of spinal curvatures
    - Boston brace, a kind of back brace used in the treatment of spinal curvatures
  - Cervical collar, also called a neck brace, used to restrict neck movement
- Dental braces, a device used to reposition teeth

== Clothing ==
- Brace (armor), a shortened form of vambrace
- Braces (clothing), elastic fabric straps used to support trousers (known in American English as suspenders)

== Construction and industrial arts ==
- Bracing (mechanics), a structural element designed to resist forces
- Brace (tool), a hand tool for drilling holes, also known as a bit brace
- A reinforcement used in architecture, such as in timber framing
- Wheel brace, aka lug wrench, used to remove nuts or bolts holding wheels to a vehicle
- Bracing (aeronautics), struts and wires which stiffen and strengthen the airframe
- Cross bracing, a system utilized to reinforce building structures in which diagonal supports intersect
- Guy-wire, a tensioned cable designed to add stability to a free-standing structure

== People ==
- Brace (surname)
- Brace (singer) (born 1986), Dutch singer
- Brace Arquiza (born 2000), Filipino actor, model, dancer and singer
- Brace Beemer (1902–1965), American radio actor and announcer
- Brace Belden (born 1989), American leftist

== Places ==
- Brace Brook, tributary of the Lackawanna River in Pennsylvania
- Brace Farm, historic home and farm in New York
- Brace Hill, mountain located in the Catskill Mountains
- Brace Mountain, the peak of a ridge in the southern Taconic Mountains
- Braces Point, northeast point of Vindication Island, South Sandwich Islands
- Meole Brace, suburb of Shrewsbury, Shropshire, England

== Posture ==
- Brace position, a body stance used to prepare for a crash
- Military brace, a body posture primarily used in military schools

== Music ==
- Brace (music), connecting two staves
- Guitar bracing, internal reinforcements of a classical or acoustic guitar
- Brace (album), a 2016 album by Birds of Tokyo
  - "Brace" (song), the album's title song
- Brace (singer) (born 1986), Dutch singer
- DJ Brace (born 1980), DJ and producer

== Sports ==
- Brace (sports), a term meaning "scoring twice in a game" in a number of sports (cf., hat-trick)
- Brace (MMA), MMA organization

== Other meanings ==
- Brace (sailing), the lines used to rotate the yards around the mast
- Braces (punctuation), the "{" and "}" symbols, i.e., "curly brackets"
  - Curly bracket programming language, a programming language that uses braces
  - Bracing style, a type of indent style used in computer programming
- "Braces" (Care Bears episode), an episode of Care Bears

== See also ==
- Bracer, a strap or sheath used in archery
- Bracket (disambiguation)
- BRAC (disambiguation)
- Support (disambiguation)
