= Lateral =

Lateral is a geometric term of location which may also refer to:

== Biology and healthcare ==
- Lateral (anatomy), a term of location meaning "towards the side"
- Lateral cricoarytenoid muscle, an intrinsic muscle of the larynx
- Lateral release (surgery), a surgical procedure to release tight capsular structures

== Other uses ==
- Lateral, a digital journal and production of the Cultural Studies Association
- Lateral, a podcast by English presenter and former web developer Tom Scott
- Lateral canal, a canal built along the same right-of-way as an existing stream
- Lateral consonant, a consonant in which the airstream proceeds along one or both of the sides of the tongue
- Lateral mark, a sea mark used in maritime pilotage to indicate the edge of a channel
- Lateral modes, an aspect of dynamic stability and control in the field of aircraft flight dynamics
- Lateral pass, a non-advancing move in gridiron football
- Lateral release (phonetics), the release of a plosive consonant into a lateral consonant
- Lateral support (disambiguation)
- Lateral thinking, a manner of solving problems using an indirect and creative approach
- Lateral, a 2025 album by Brian Eno and Beatie Wolfe

== See also ==
- Bilateral (disambiguation)
- Latitude
