= Lateral release =

Lateral release may refer to:

- Lateral release (surgery), a surgical procedure
- Lateral release (phonetics), a type of articulation of a sound
