= Patella =

Kneecap, bone covering knee joint

- Right knee

Details
- Pronunciation: /pəˈtɛlə/
- Origins: Present at the joint of femur and tibia fibula

Identifiers
- Latin: patella
- MeSH: D010329
- TA98: A02.5.05.001
- TA2: 1390
- FMA: 24485

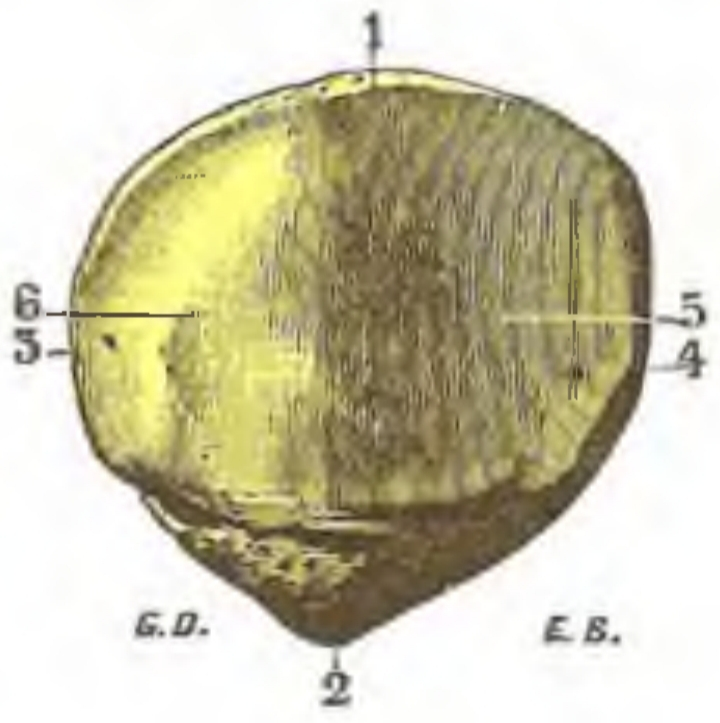
Posterior aspect of right human patella. (After Testut's Anatomy.)

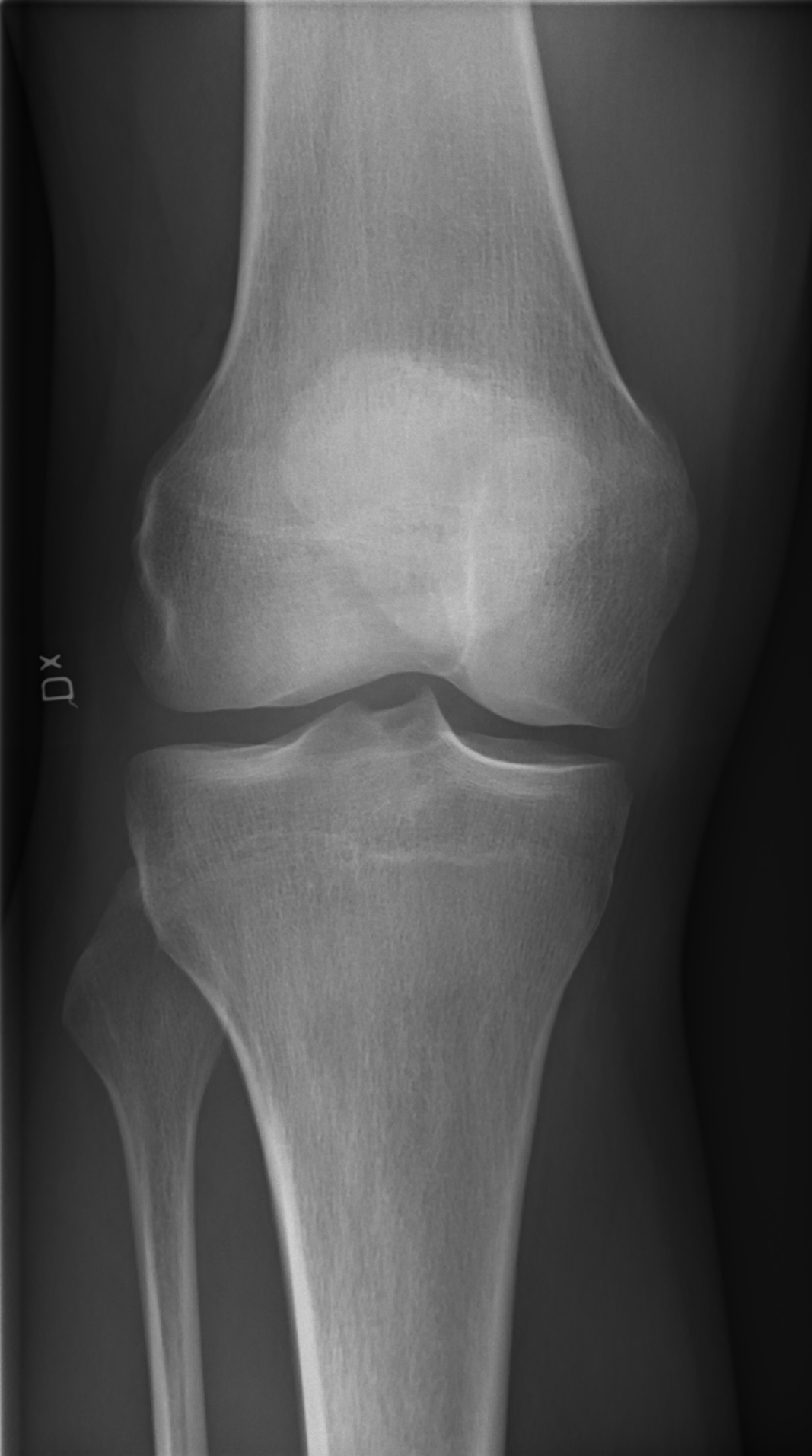
X-ray of a normal adult right-sided patella by anteroposterior projection

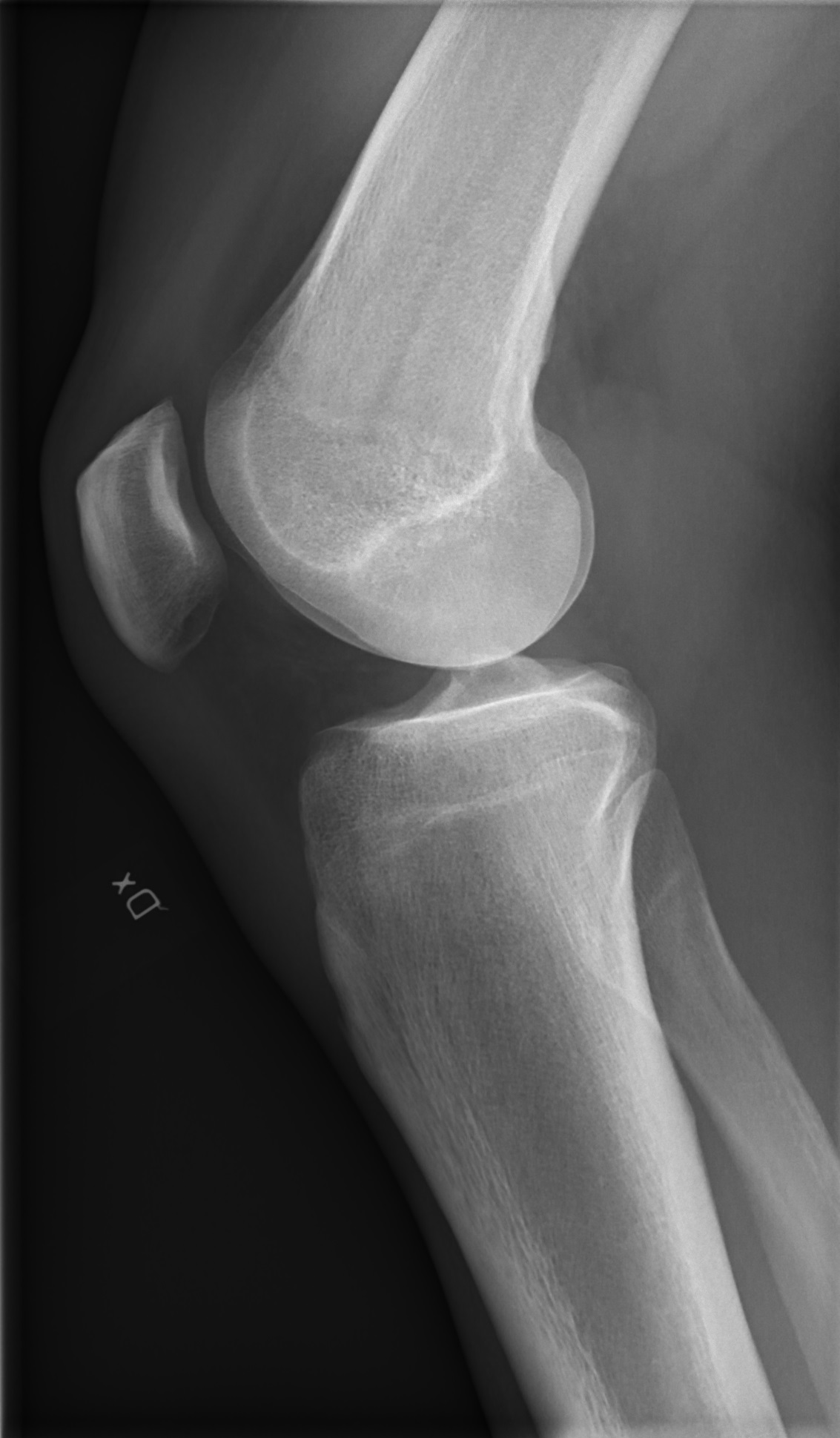
X-ray of a normal adult right-sided patella by lateral projection

The patella (pl.: patellae or patellas), also known as the kneecap, is a flat, rounded triangular bone which articulates with the femur (thigh bone) and covers and protects the anterior articular surface of the knee joint. The patella is found in many tetrapods, such as mice, cats, birds, humans, and dogs, but not in whales, or most reptiles.

In humans, the patella is the largest sesamoid bone (i.e., embedded within a tendon or a muscle) in the body.

== Structure ==
The patella is a sesamoid bone roughly triangular in shape, with the apex of the patella facing downwards. The apex is the most inferior (lowest) part of the patella. It is pointed in shape, and gives attachment to the patellar tendon.

The front and back surfaces are joined by a thin margin and towards centre by a thicker margin. The tendon of the quadriceps femoris muscle attaches to the base of the patella, with the vastus intermedius muscle attaching to the base itself, and the vastus lateralis and vastus medialis are attached to outer lateral and medial borders of patella respectively.

The upper third of the anterior surface is coarse, flattened, and rough, and serves for the attachment of the tendon of the quadriceps and often has exostoses. The middle third has numerous vascular canaliculi. The lower third culminates in the apex which serves as the origin of the patellar tendon. The posterior surface is divided into two parts.

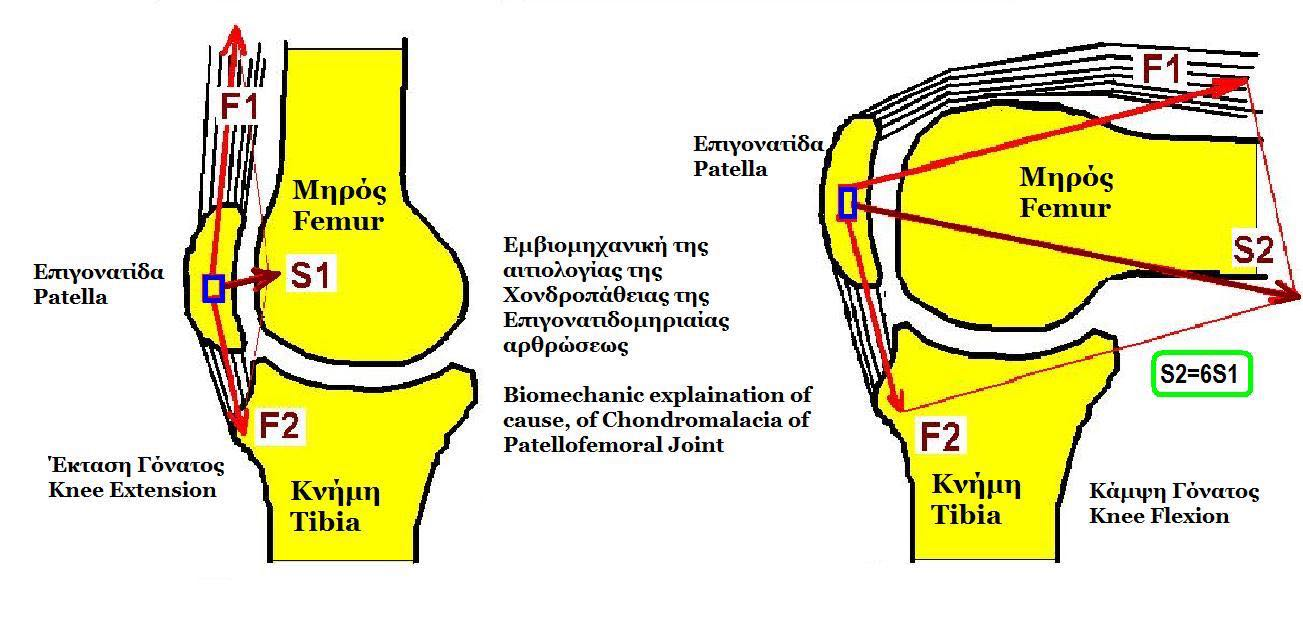
Flexion and extension of knee

The upper three-quarters of the posterior surface articulates with the femur and is subdivided into a medial and a lateral (broader) facet by a vertical ridge.

In the adult the articular surface is about 12 cm^{2} (2 sq in) and covered by hyaline cartilage, which can reach a maximal thickness of 6 mm (1/4 in) in the centre at about 30 years of age. Owing to the great stress on the patellofemoral joint during resisted knee flexion, the articular cartilage of the patella is among the thickest in the human body.

The lower part of the posterior surface has vascular canaliculi and is filled by fatty tissue, the so-called Hoffa's fat pad.

=== Variation ===
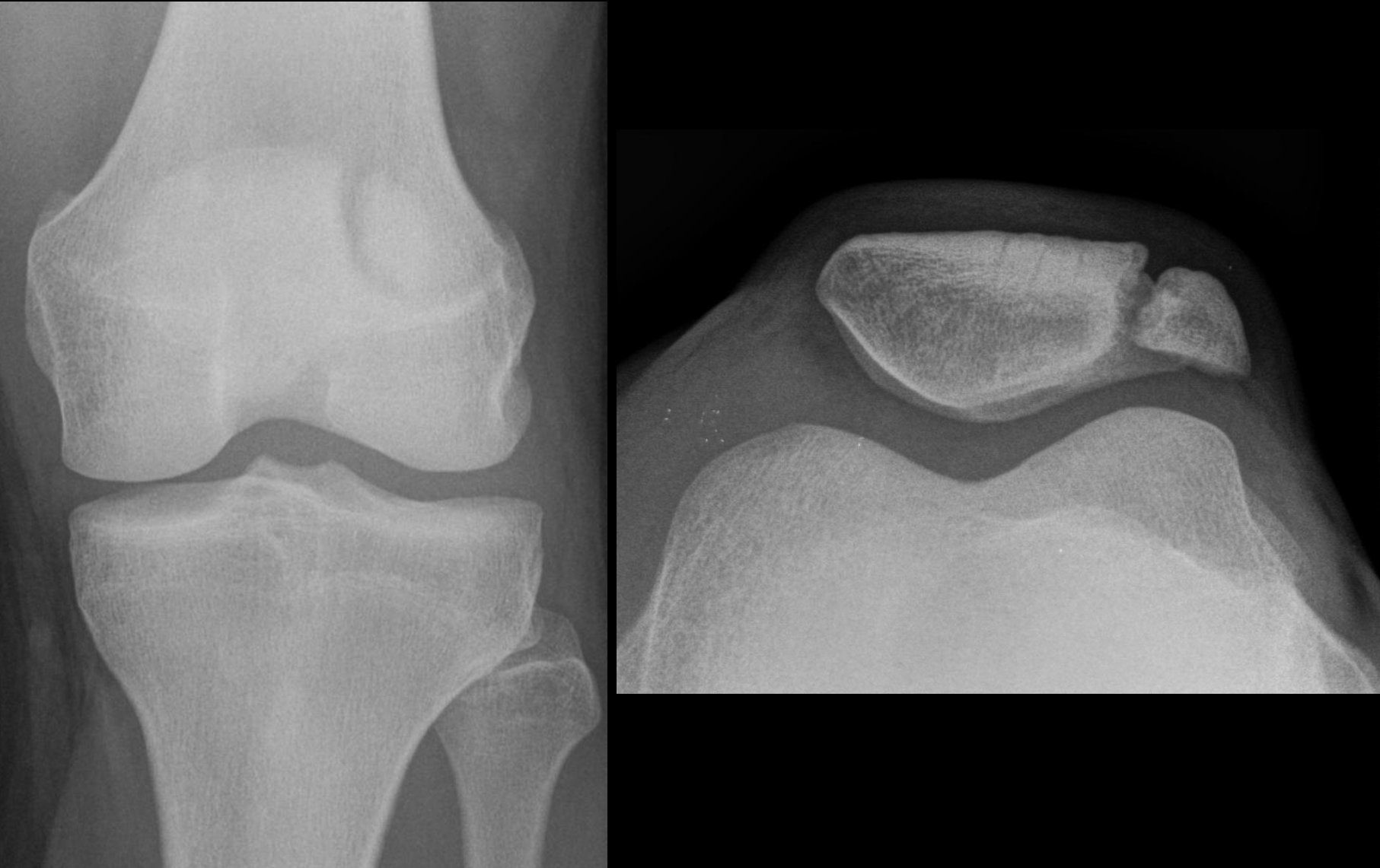
In this X-ray, an anatomical variation of the patella can be seen – the bipartate patella, in which the patella is split into two parts.

Emarginations (i.e. patella emarginata, a "missing piece") are common laterally on the proximal edge. Bipartite patellas are the result of an ossification of a second cartilaginous layer at the location of an emargination. Previously, bipartite patellas were explained as the failure of several ossification centres to fuse, but this idea has been rejected. Partite patellas occur almost exclusively in men. Tripartite and even multipartite patellas occur.

The upper three-quarters of the patella articulates with the femur and is subdivided into a medial and a lateral facet by a vertical ledge which varies in shape. Four main types of articular surface can be distinguished:

1. Most commonly the medial articular surface is smaller than the lateral.
2. Sometimes both articular surfaces are virtually equal in size.
3. Occasionally, the medial surface is hypoplastic or
4. the central ledge is only indicated.

=== Development ===
In humans, the patella appears as a cartilaginous point in the course of the third fetal month. Infants are born with a patella of soft cartilage which begins to ossify (i.e., turn into bone) by a single centre at about age three. Ossification is completed about the age of puberty.

== Function ==
The primary functional role of the patella is knee extension. The patella increases the leverage that the quadriceps tendon can exert on the femur by increasing the angle at which it acts.

The patella is attached to the tendon of the quadriceps femoris muscle, which contracts to extend/straighten the knee. The patella is stabilized by the insertion of the horizontal fibres of vastus medialis and by the prominence of the lateral femoral condyle, which discourages lateral dislocation during flexion. The retinacular fibres of the patella also stabilize it during exercise.

== Clinical significance ==
=== Dislocation ===
Patellar dislocations occur with significant regularity, particularly in young female athletes. It involves the patella sliding out of its position on the knee, most often laterally, and may be associated with excruciating pain and swelling. The patella can be tracked back into the groove with an extension of the knee, and therefore sometimes returns into the proper position on its own.

==== Treatment ====
For recurrent patellar dislocations or cases with chronic instability, surgical intervention may be necessary. Patella stabilization surgery aims to restore proper kneecap tracking and reduce the risk of future dislocations. Surgical options include reconstruction of the medial patellofemoral ligament (MPFL), realignment procedures such as osteotomy, and soft tissue adjustments around the patella. MPFL reconstruction typically involves harvesting a hamstring tendon, commonly the gracilis, to create a new ligament that is positioned anatomically and secured with suture anchors.

Recovery from patella stabilization surgery typically requires six to eight weeks, during which patients may need to use crutches initially and follow a structured physical therapy program to regain range of motion and strengthen the surrounding musculature.

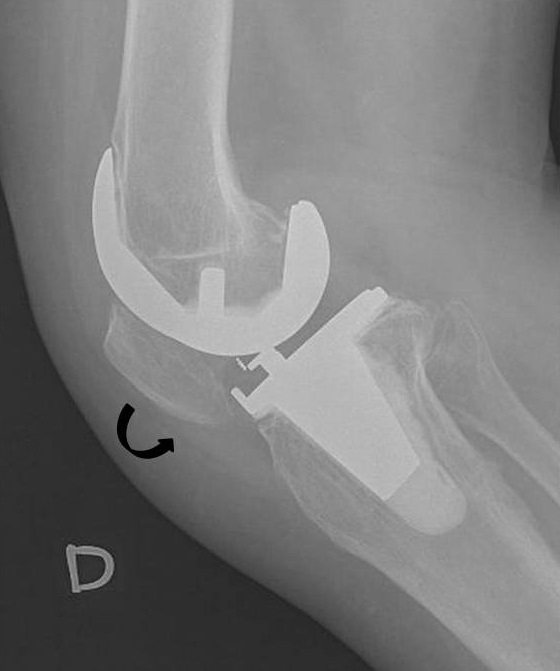
Patella baja

=== Vertical alignment ===
A patella alta is a high-riding (superiorly aligned) patella. An attenuated patella alta is an unusually small patella that develops out of and above the joint.

A patella baja is a low-riding patella. A long-standing patella baja may result in extensor dysfunction.

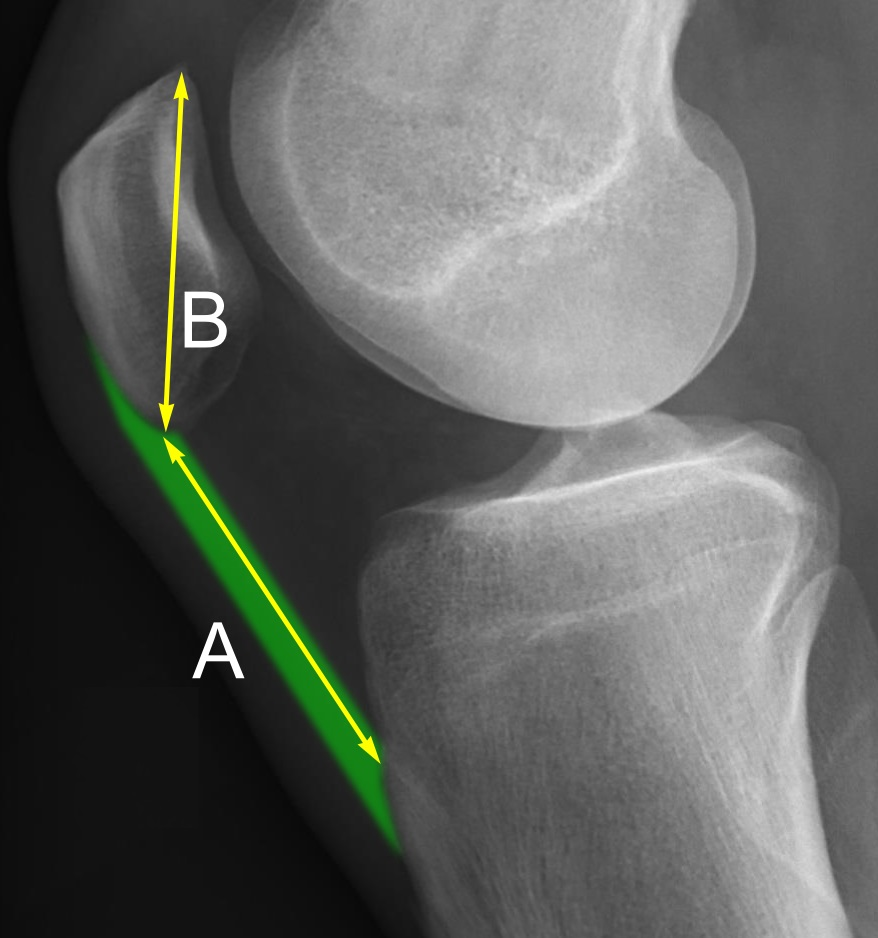
Insall-Salvati ratio (A divided by B).

The Insall-Salvati ratio helps to indicate patella baja on lateral X-rays, and is calculated as the patellar tendon length divided by the patellar bone length. An Insall-Salvati ratio of < 0.8 indicates patella baja.

=== Fracture ===
The kneecap is prone to injury because of its particularly exposed location, and fractures of the patella commonly occur as a consequence of direct trauma onto the knee. These fractures usually cause swelling and pain in the region, bleeding into the joint (hemarthrosis), and an inability to extend the knee. Patella fractures are usually treated with surgery, unless the damage is minimal and the extensor mechanism is intact.

=== Exostosis ===
An exostosis is the formation of new bone onto a bone, as a result of excess calcium formation. This can be the cause of chronic pain when formed on the patella.

== Other animals ==
The patella is found in placental mammals and birds; most marsupials have only rudimentary, non-ossified patellae although a few species possess a bony patella. A patella is also present in the living monotremes, the platypus and the echidna. In other tetrapods, including living amphibians and most reptiles (except some lepidosaurs), the muscle tendons from the upper leg are attached directly to the tibia, and a patella is not present. In 2017 it was discovered that some frog species have a cartilaginous structure which may be kneecaps, contrary to what was previously thought. This raises the possibility that the kneecap arose 350 million years ago when tetrapods first appeared, but that it disappeared in some animals.

== Etymology ==
The word patella originated in the late 17th century from the diminutive form of Latin patina or patena or paten, meaning shallow dish.

== See also ==
- Knee pain
- Lateral release
- Lateral retinaculum
- Osteoarthritis
- Patellar reflex
