= Subsidence =

Downward vertical movement of the Earth's surface

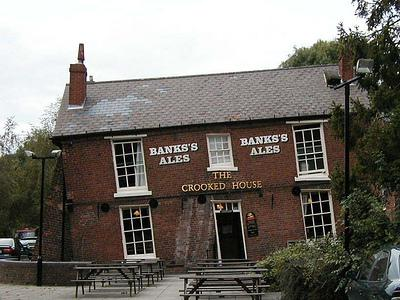
The Crooked House, a public house with a noticeable lean, the result of 19th-century mining subsidence in Staffordshire, England

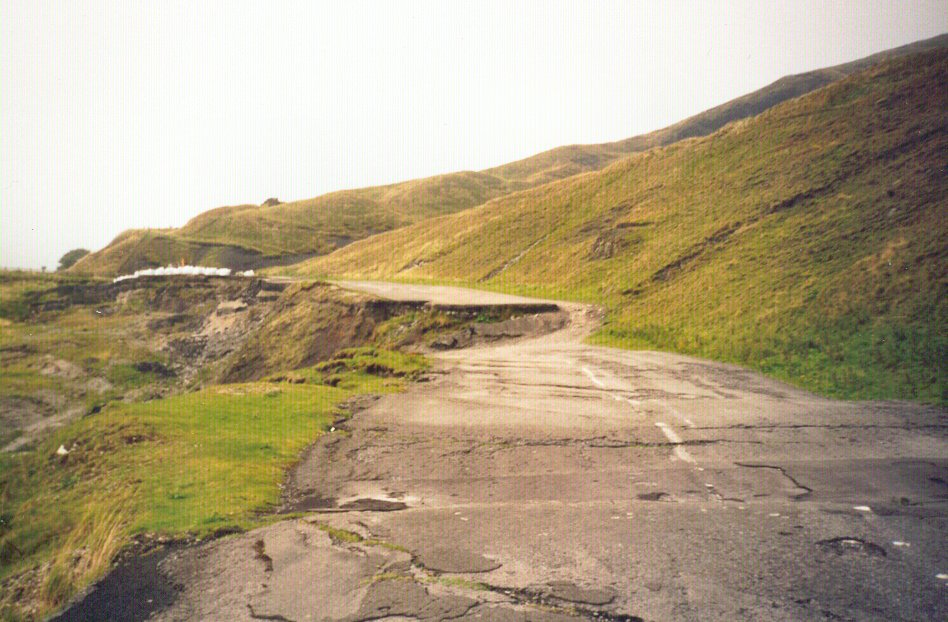
Mam Tor road destroyed by subsidence and shear, near Castleton, Derbyshire

Subsidence is a general term for downward vertical movement of the Earth's surface, which can be caused by both natural processes and human activities. Subsidence involves little or no horizontal movement, which distinguishes it from slope movement.

Processes that lead to subsidence include dissolution of underlying carbonate rock by groundwater; gradual compaction of sediments; withdrawal of fluid lava from beneath a solidified crust of rock; mining; pumping of subsurface fluids, such as groundwater or petroleum; or warping of the Earth's crust by tectonic forces. Subsidence resulting from tectonic deformation of the crust is known as tectonic subsidence and can create accommodation for sediments to accumulate and eventually lithify into sedimentary rock.

Ground subsidence is of global concern to geologists, geotechnical engineers, surveyors, engineers, urban planners, landowners, and the public in general. Pumping of groundwater or petroleum has led to subsidence of as much as 9 meters (30 ft) in many locations around the world and incurring costs measured in hundreds of millions of US dollars. Land subsidence caused by groundwater withdrawal will likely increase in occurrence and related damages, primarily due to global population and economic growth, which will continue to drive higher groundwater demand.

== Causes ==
=== Groundwater-related subsidence ===
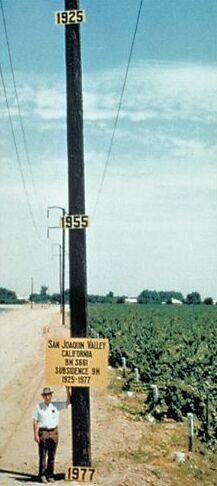
San Joaquin Valley subsidence

Groundwater-related subsidence is the sinking of land resulting from groundwater extraction. It is a growing problem in the developing world as cities increase in population and water use, without adequate pumping regulation and enforcement. One estimate has 80% of serious land subsidence problems associated with the excessive extraction of groundwater, making it a growing problem throughout the world.

Groundwater fluctuations can also indirectly affect the decay of organic material. The habitation of lowlands, such as coastal or delta plains, requires drainage. The resulting aeration of the soil leads to the oxidation of its organic components, such as peat, and this decomposition process may cause significant land subsidence. This applies especially when groundwater levels are periodically adapted to subsidence, in order to maintain desired unsaturated zone depths, exposing more and more peat to oxygen. In addition to this, drained soils consolidate as a result of increased effective stress. In this way, land subsidence has the potential of becoming self-perpetuating, having rates up to 5 cm/yr. Water management used to be tuned primarily to factors such as crop optimization but, to varying extents, avoiding subsidence has come to be taken into account as well.

=== Dissolution of limestone ===
Subsidence causes major problems in karst terrains, where dissolution of limestone by fluid flow in the subsurface creates voids (i.e., caves). If the roof of a void becomes too weak, it can collapse and the overlying rock and earth will fall into the space, causing subsidence at the surface. This type of subsidence can cause sinkholes which can be many hundreds of meters deep.

=== Mining ===
Several types of sub-surface mining, and specifically methods which intentionally cause the extracted void to collapse (such as pillar extraction, longwall mining and any metalliferous mining method which uses "caving" such as "block caving" or "sub-level caving") will result in surface subsidence. Mining-induced subsidence is relatively predictable in its magnitude, manifestation and extent, except where a sudden pillar or near-surface tunnel collapse occurs (usually very old workings). Mining-induced subsidence is nearly always very localized to the surface above the mined area, plus a margin around the outside. The vertical magnitude of the subsidence itself typically does not cause problems, except in the case of drainage (including natural drainage)–rather, it is the associated surface compressive and tensile strains, curvature, tilts and horizontal displacement that are the cause of the worst damage to the natural environment, buildings and infrastructure.

Where mining activity is planned, mining-induced subsidence can be successfully managed if there is co-operation from all of the stakeholders. This is accomplished through a combination of careful mine planning, the taking of preventive measures, and the carrying out of repairs post-mining.

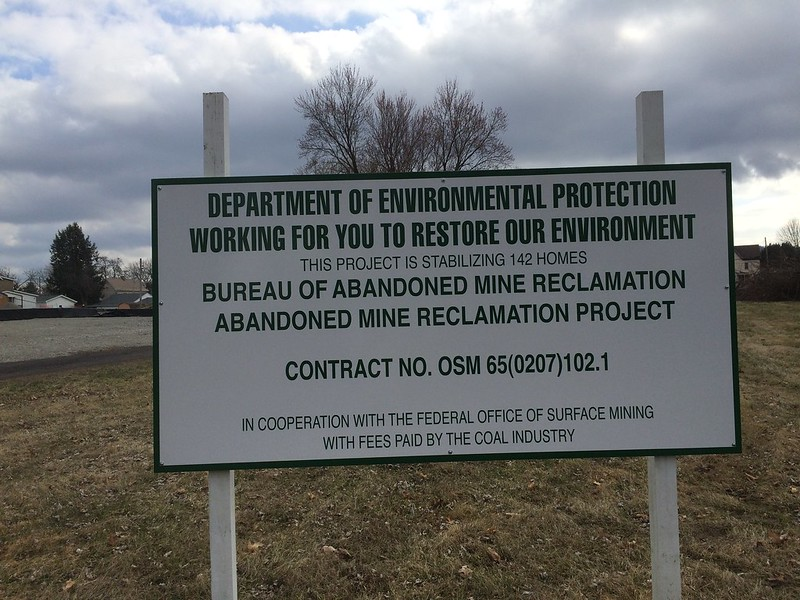
Stabilizing damaged homes above underground mine in Bradenville PA USA

Types of ground subsidence

=== Extraction of petroleum and natural gas ===
If natural gas is extracted from a natural gas field the initial pressure (up to 60 MPa (600 bar)) in the field will drop over the years. The pressure helps support the soil layers above the field. If the gas is extracted, the overburden pressure sediment compacts and may lead to earthquakes and subsidence at the ground level.

Since exploitation of the Slochteren (Netherlands) gas field started in the late 1960s the ground level over a 250 km^{2} area has dropped by a current maximum of 30 cm.

Extraction of petroleum likewise can cause significant subsidence. The city of Long Beach, California, has experienced 9 meters (30 ft) over the course of 34 years of petroleum extraction, resulting in damage of over $100 million to infrastructure in the area. The subsidence was brought to a halt when secondary recovery wells pumped enough water into the oil reservoir to stabilize it.

=== Earthquake ===
Land subsidence can occur in various ways during an earthquake. Large areas of land can subside drastically during an earthquake because of offset along fault lines. Land subsidence can also occur as a result of settling and compacting of unconsolidated sediment from the shaking of an earthquake.

The Geospatial Information Authority of Japan reported immediate subsidence caused by the 2011 Tōhoku earthquake. In Northern Japan, subsidence of 0.50 m (1.64 ft) was observed on the coast of the Pacific Ocean in Miyako, Tōhoku, while Rikuzentakata, Iwate measured 0.84 m (2.75 ft). In the south at Sōma, Fukushima, 0.29 m (0.95 ft) was observed. The maximum amount of subsidence was 1.2 m (3.93 ft), coupled with horizontal diastrophism of up to 5.3 m (17.3 ft) on the Oshika Peninsula in Miyagi Prefecture.

=== Faulting induced ===
When differential stresses exist in the Earth, these can be accommodated either by geological faulting in the brittle crust, or by ductile flow in the hotter and more fluid mantle. Where faults occur, absolute subsidence may occur in the hanging wall of normal faults. In reverse, or thrust, faults, relative subsidence may be measured in the footwall.

=== Isostatic subsidence ===
The crust floats buoyantly in the asthenosphere, with a ratio of mass below the "surface" in proportion to its own density and the density of the asthenosphere. If mass is added to a local area of the crust (e.g., through deposition), the crust subsides to compensate and maintain isostatic balance.

The opposite of isostatic subsidence is known as isostatic rebound—the action of the crust returning (sometimes over periods of thousands of years) to a state of isostacy, such as after the melting of large ice sheets or the drying-up of large lakes after the last ice age. Lake Bonneville is a famous example of isostatic rebound. Due to the weight of the water once held in the lake, the earth's crust subsided nearly 200 feet (61 m) to maintain equilibrium. When the lake dried up, the crust rebounded. Today at Lake Bonneville, the center of the former lake is about 200 feet (61 m) higher than the former lake edges.

=== Seasonal effects ===
Many soils contain significant proportions of clay. Because of the very small particle size, they are affected by changes in soil moisture content. Seasonal drying of the soil results in a lowering of both the volume and the surface of the soil. If building foundations are above the level reached by seasonal drying, they move, possibly resulting in damage to the building in the form of tapering cracks.

Trees and other vegetation can have a significant local effect on seasonal drying of soils. Over a number of years, a cumulative drying occurs as the tree grows. That can lead to the opposite of subsidence, known as heave or swelling of the soil, when the tree declines or is felled. As the cumulative moisture deficit is reversed, which can last up to 25 years, the surface level around the tree will rise and expand laterally. That often damages buildings unless the foundations have been strengthened or designed to cope with the effect.

=== Weight of buildings ===
High buildings can create land subsidence by pressing the soil beneath with their weight. The problem is already felt in New York City, the San Francisco Bay Area, and Lagos.

== Impacts ==
=== Increase of flooding potential ===
Land subsidence leads to the lowering of the ground surface, altering the topography. This elevation reduction increases the risk of flooding, particularly in river flood plains and delta areas.

==== Sinking cities ====
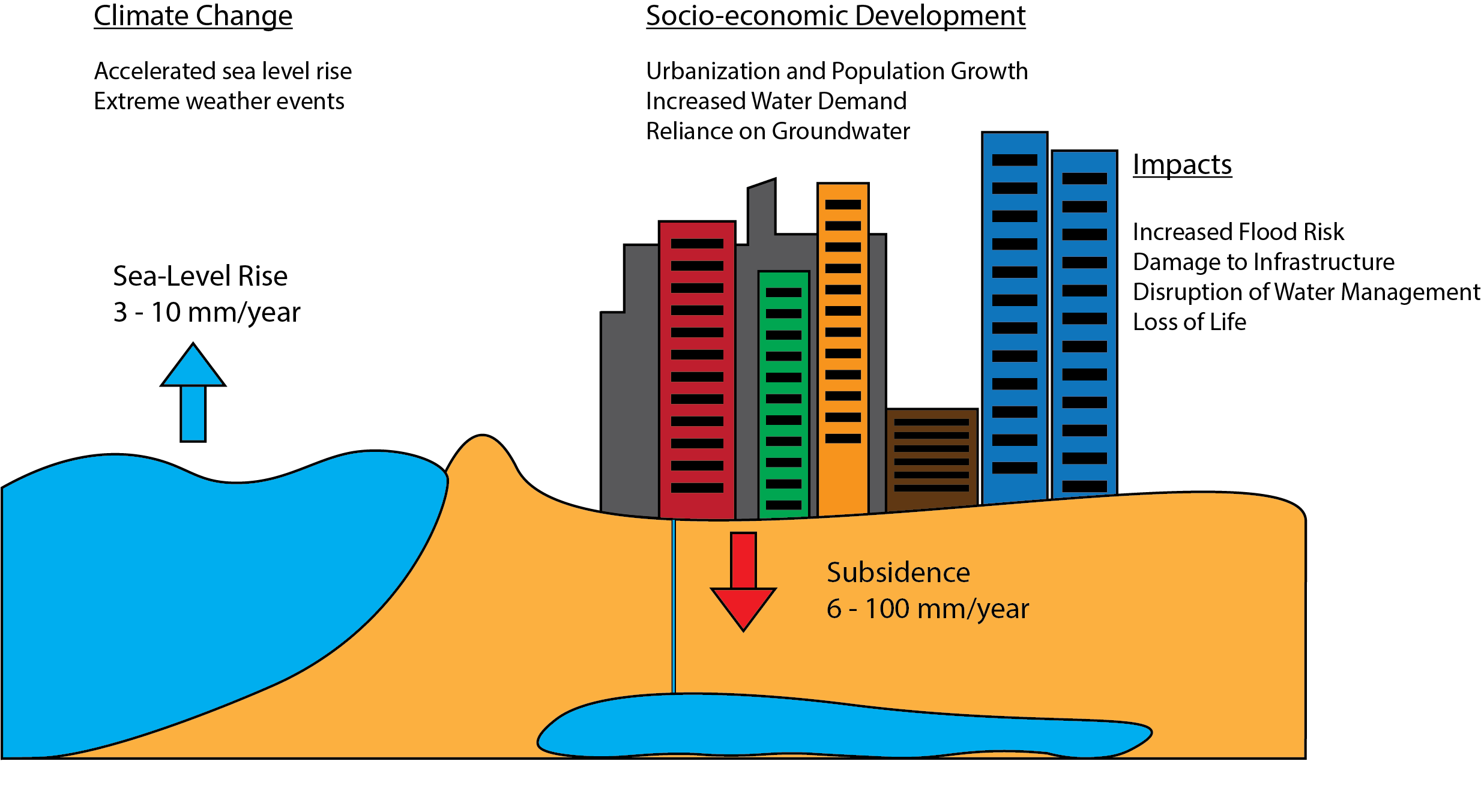
Drivers, processes, and impacts of sinking cities

Sinking cities are urban environments that are in danger of disappearing due to their rapidly changing landscapes. The largest contributors to these cities becoming unlivable are the combined effects of climate change (manifested through sea level rise, intensifying storms, and storm surge), land subsidence, and accelerated urbanization. Many of the world's largest and most rapidly growing cities are located along rivers and coasts, exposing them to natural disasters. Metropolitan areas were built on flat flood plains due to their suitability for agriculture, urban development, and international trade; however, these flood plains are often geologically young (only several thousand years old), and human activities such as groundwater extraction and urban development can trigger rapid subsidence, creating compound risks alongside sea level rise. As countries continue to invest people, assets, and infrastructure into these cities, the loss potential in these areas also increases. Sinking cities must overcome substantial barriers to properly prepare for today's dynamic environmental climate.

=== Earth fissures ===
Earth fissures are linear fractures that appear on the land surface, characterized by openings or offsets. These fissures can be several meters deep, several meters wide, and extend for several kilometers. They form when the deformation of an aquifer, caused by pumping, concentrates stress in the sediment. This inhomogeneous deformation results in the differential compaction of the sediments. Ground fissures develop when this tensile stress exceeds the tensile strength of the sediment.

=== Infrastructure damage ===
Land subsidence can lead to differential settlements in buildings and other infrastructures, causing angular distortions. When these angular distortions exceed certain values, the structures can become damaged, resulting in issues such as tilting or cracking.

== Field measurement ==
Land subsidence causes vertical displacements (subsidence or uplift). Although horizontal displacements also occur, they are generally less significant. The following are field methods used to measure vertical and horizontal displacements in subsiding areas:

- Surveying.
- Borehole extensometers.
- Global Navigation Satellite System (GNSS)
- Interferometric Synthetic Aperture Radar (InSAR)
- LiDAR
- Tiltmeters.

Tomás et al. conducted a comparative analysis of various land subsidence monitoring techniques. The results indicated that InSAR offered the highest coverage, lowest annual cost per point of information and the highest point density. Additionally, they found that, aside from continuous acquisition systems typically installed in areas with rapid subsidence, InSAR had the highest measurement frequencies. In contrast, leveling, non-permanent GNSS, and non-permanent extensometers generally provided only one or two measurements per year.

== Prediction ==
Empirical Methods
These methods project future land subsidence trends by extrapolating from existing data, treating subsidence as a function solely of time. The extrapolation can be performed either visually or by fitting appropriate curves. Common functions used for fitting include linear, bilinear, quadratic, and/or exponential models. For example, this method has been successfully applied for predicting mining-induced subsidence.

Semi-empirical or statistical methods
These approaches evaluate land subsidence based on its relationship with one or more influencing factors, such as changes in groundwater levels, the volume of groundwater extraction, and clay content.

Theoretical methods
- 1D model: This model assumes that changes in piezometric levels affecting aquifers and aquitards occur only in the vertical direction. It allows for subsidence calculations at a specific point using only vertical soil parameters.
- Quasi-3D Model: Quasi-three-dimensional seepage models apply Terzaghi's one-dimensional consolidation equation to estimate subsidence, integrating some aspects of three-dimensional effects.
- 3D Model: The fully coupled three-dimensional model simulates water flow in three dimensions and calculates subsidence using Biot's three-dimensional consolidation theory.

Machine learning
Machine learning has become a new approach for tackling nonlinear problems. It has emerged as a promising method for simulating and predicting land subsidence.

== Instances worldwide ==
Location	Depositional environment	Maximum subsidence rate (mm/year) and period	Cause	Impacts	Remedial or protective measurements	References
Bangkok, Thailand	Fluvial and marine deposits from the Holocene	<120 (1981)	Groundwater extraction	Intensification of city flooding, shoreline regression, intrusion of salt water and foundation engineering problems.	Groundwater pricing policies, the expansion of tap water supply from surface sources in underserved industrial suburban areas and strict implementation of the groundwater usage ban	
Beijing, China	Alluvial sediments	>100 (2010-2011)	Groundwater extraction		The South-to-North Water Diversion Project Central Route (SNWDP-CR) was built to redistribute water resources.	
Datong coal field, China	Jurassic and Carboniferous coal seams	17 (2003-2010) <1146 (2022-2023)	Groundwater overpumping from mines and coal mining subsidence.	Soil avalanche, landslide, mud-rock flow, surface settlement, earth fissures and surface gangue stack..		
Guadalentín, Spain	Alluvial and fluvial sediments	>110 (1992-2012)	Groundwater extraction	Increase of flooding potential		
Gediz River Basin, Türkiye	Graben filled with approximately 500 m of Pliocene and Quaternary alluvial material.	64.0 (2017-2021)	Groundwater extraction and tectonics	Several earth fissures and damage on buildings		
Jakarta, Indonesia	Alluvial sediments	260 (1991-1997) 100 (1997-2002)	Groundwater extraction	Cracking of permanent structures, expanded flooding areas, lowered groundwater levels, and increased inland seawater intrusion.		
Karapınar, Turkey	Miocene–Pliocene conglomerate, sandstone, marl, limestone, tuff, and evaporites		Dissolution			
La Unión, Spain	Sandstones, conglomerates, phyllites and limestones	7 (2003-2004)	Underground mining activities	Collapse of one building and damage on surrounding buildings	Prohibition of construction in the urban area affected by subsidence.	
México City, Mexico	Alluvial and lacustrine sediments	387 (2014-2020)	Groundwater extraction	Development of earth fissures. Damage on buildings.		
Murcia, Spain	Alluvial and fluvial sediments	26 (2004-2008)	Groundwater extraction	Damage on 150 buildings	Closure of urban wells	
Patos-Marinza oil field, Albania	Carbonates and siliciclastic deposits	15 (2015-2018)	Extraction of petroleum			
San Joaquin Valley, California, USA	Alluvial and lacustrine sediments.	500 (1923-1970) 80 (1921-1960)	Groundwater extraction		Importation of surface water to agricultural areas in the San Joaquin Valley, California, via the California Aqueduct from the late 1960s.	
Shanghai, China	Marine sediments	87 (2019-2020)	Groundwater extraction	The economic loss caused by ground subsidence in Shanghai from 2001 to 2020 amounted to over 24.57 billion yuan.	Restriction of groundwater use, artificial recharge with treated river water, and adjustment of pumping patterns	
Tehran, Iran	Alluvial sediments	217 (2017-2019)	Groundwater extraction			
Venice, Italy	Deltaic and lagoon deposits	1 (before 1952) 6.5 (1952-1968) 4 (2003-2010)	Groundwater extraction		Decrease of groundwater extraction. Some areas were supplied with water from inland.	

== See also ==
- Cave-in
- Lateral and subjacent support, a related concept in property law
- Mass wasting
- Settlement (structural)
- Sinkhole
- Soil liquefaction
- UNESCO Working Group on Land Subsidence
- Sea level rise
