= Brac =

Brac may refer to:

- Brač, an island of Croatia
- Brač (instrument), a type of tamburica, a lute-like instrument popular in South and East Europe
- Brac, Poland, a village near Drawno in Pomerania
- BRAC (organisation), international development organisation based in Bangladesh

== See also ==
- BRAC
