= Bipartite patella =

- Other names: Patella bipartita
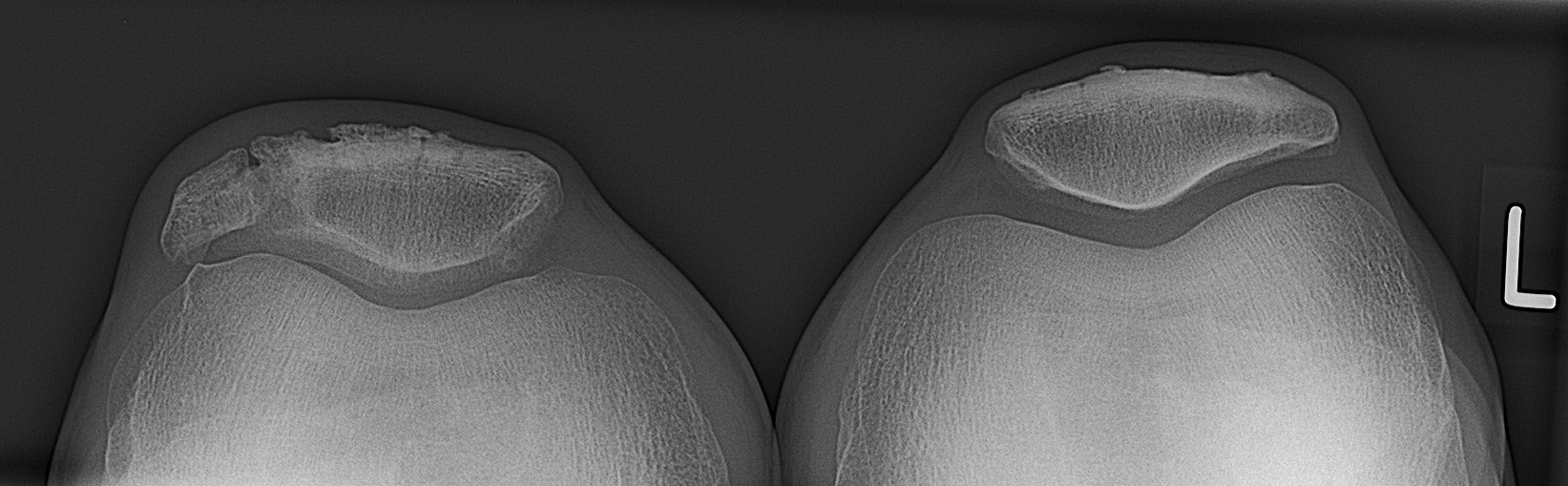
- Bipartite patella as seen from front, right knee left
- Specialty: Medical genetics

Bipartite patella is a condition where the patella, or kneecap, is composed of two separate bones. Instead of fusing together as normally occurs in early childhood, the bones of the patella remain separated. The condition occurs in approximately 1–2% of the population, and is equally likely to occur in males and females. It is often asymptomatic and most commonly diagnosed as an incidental finding, with about 2% of cases becoming symptomatic.

The overall incidence of bipartite patella in the general population is approximately 1–2%, and it occurs equally in males and females The most common form is asymptomatic and usually discovered incidentally during knee imaging performed for unrelated reasons. Only about 2% of cases become symptomatic, presenting with anterior knee pain, local tenderness, or activity-related discomfort. The pathophysiology of symptom onset is not fully understood, but repetitive microtrauma at the fibrocartilaginous synchondrosis between the fragments and the resulting local inflammation are considered key mechanisms. Therefore, symptomatic bipartite patella is often regarded as an overuse syndrome rather than a true structural defect.

Saupe introduced a classification system for Bipartite Patella back in 1921. Type 1: Fragment is located at the bottom of the kneecap (5% of cases) Type 2: Fragment is located on the lateral side of the kneecap (20% of cases) Type 3: Fragment is located on the upper lateral border of the kneecap (75% of cases)
