= Than E =

Burmese singer

- မသန်းအေး
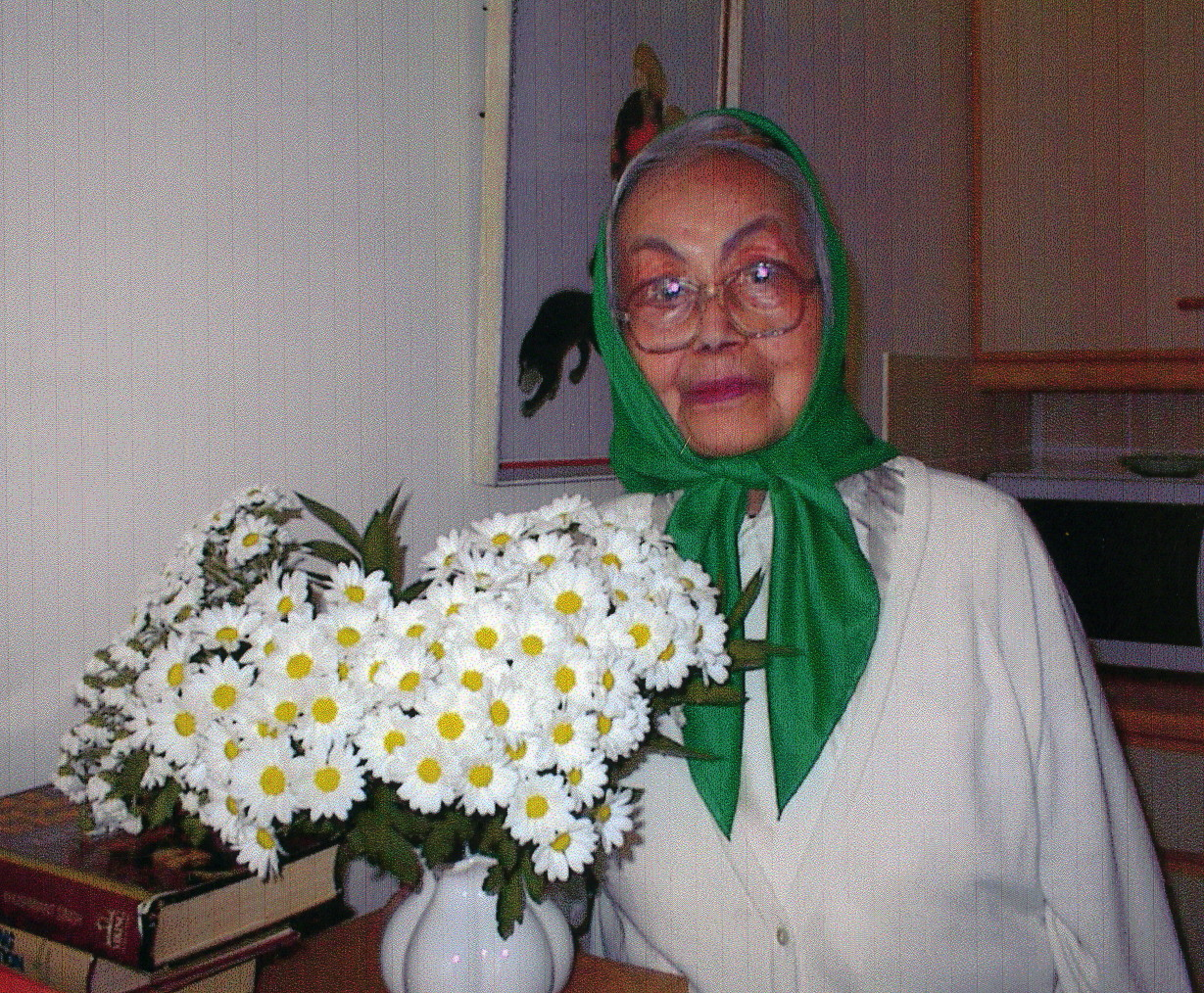
- Than E at Oxford in 2002
- Born: Ma Than E 16 February 1908; Rangoon, Burma
- Died: 17 June 2007 (aged 99); Oxford, United Kingdom
- Other name: Bilat Pyan Than (ဘိလပ်ပြန်သန်း)
- Education: Rangoon University; Teacher's Training College; London University
- Occupations: Civil servant, broadcaster, educator and singer
- Spouse: Warner Fend

Ma Than E Fend (Burmese: မသန်းအေး, also known by her baptismal name Dora) was a prominent Burmese singer in the early 20th century, known by her stage name Bilat Pyan Than (ဘိလပ်ပြန်သန်း). Also, she was also an international civil servant, who spent a long career in the United Nations.

During the Japanese invasion of Burma during the Second World War, Ma Than escaped to India to work for the All India Radio's Burmese language service. She subsequently spent the rest of her life abroad.

== Early life and education ==
Than E was born in Rangoon, Burma to U Po Mya and Daw Htoo. Her father worked for a European trading firm and later taught Burmese and Pali at St. Paul's School for Boys (now BEHS No. 6). He taught Britons who needed a certificate of proficiency in Burmese for government or commercial positions.

Her mother was a teacher at Boys Methodist School. Than E attended English Methodist Girls School (now BEHS No. 1 Dagon). When Than E was 13, her father suffered a stroke while unsuccessfully prospecting for tin and tungsten in the malaria-infested Tenasserim Division (now Taninthayi Region). He was bedridden for nearly two years before he his death. Daw Htoo struggled under much hardship as a single mother to bring up her three children: Dora Than E and her brothers, Tommy Thaung Tin and John Than Tin.

At sixteen, Than E entered the Baptist-affiliated Judson College within the Rangoon University (now Yangon University) majoring in English Literature, Indian History and Philosophy.

Than E sang in the Judson Church choir and also joined the Glee Club, at the Judson College. The governing body of the university launched an ambitious fundraising event to raise funds for the new university buildings. Joseph Haydn's oratorio "The Creation" was selected for a fundraising performance at the great Jubilee Hall. All the church choirs in Rangoon and vicinity were recruited and the Rangoon Orchestral Society played the accompaniment. Than E was chosen to sing the duet with Hall.

She graduated with a Bachelor of Arts degree at the age of 20.

== Teaching career ==
=== 1928 - 1930 ===
After her graduation from the Judson College, Than E taught English to 9th and 10th standard students at Cushing High School in Rangoon.

After two years of teaching she applied for a state scholarship and was selected to go to the Institute of Education at University College London.

=== 1931 ===
One day, Than E got a call from the Education Officer in charge of foreign students at the India House. In 1931, Burma was still a province of India. The officer told Than E that Gerald Kelly wanted a suitable Burmese model.

The portrait painted by Gerald Kelly was titled "Sao Ohn Kya" and was reproduced in prints and sold. The model was Sao Ohn Nyunt who was a Shan Kengtung princess married to Hsipaw prince Sao Ohn Kya.

=== 1931-1942 ===
When Than E returned from England, the Great Depression that originated in the United States had spread to Burma. Many Burmese landowners lost their farms to foreign creditors and, moreover, European plantations and mining operations were closed down. There was civil and racial unrest.

As a result, no government jobs were available. However, Than E found a teaching job at ABM Karen School, a school run by the American Baptist Mission in Henzada (now Hinthada). She taught English to secondary and high school students.

The next year, she got a teaching job at the Teachers' Training College of the Rangoon University (now Yangon Institute of Education). Her job was to teach English to those training to become teachers to get the Rangoon University Diploma of Teaching. Than E also taught English to pupils in classes at the attached TTC Practicing School.

== Singing career ==
After the death of her mother, Than E stayed in the Cushing compound in Ahlon Township with her elder brother Tommy Thaung Tin and his wife Aye Nu and younger brother John Than Tin. One day, Tommy Thaung Tin came with a proposal that she sing a Burmese song for a recording to be made by his good friend, Nyi Pu of the A-One Motion Picture Company. Tommy was very persistent, so Than E agreed, practiced the song, and recorded it.

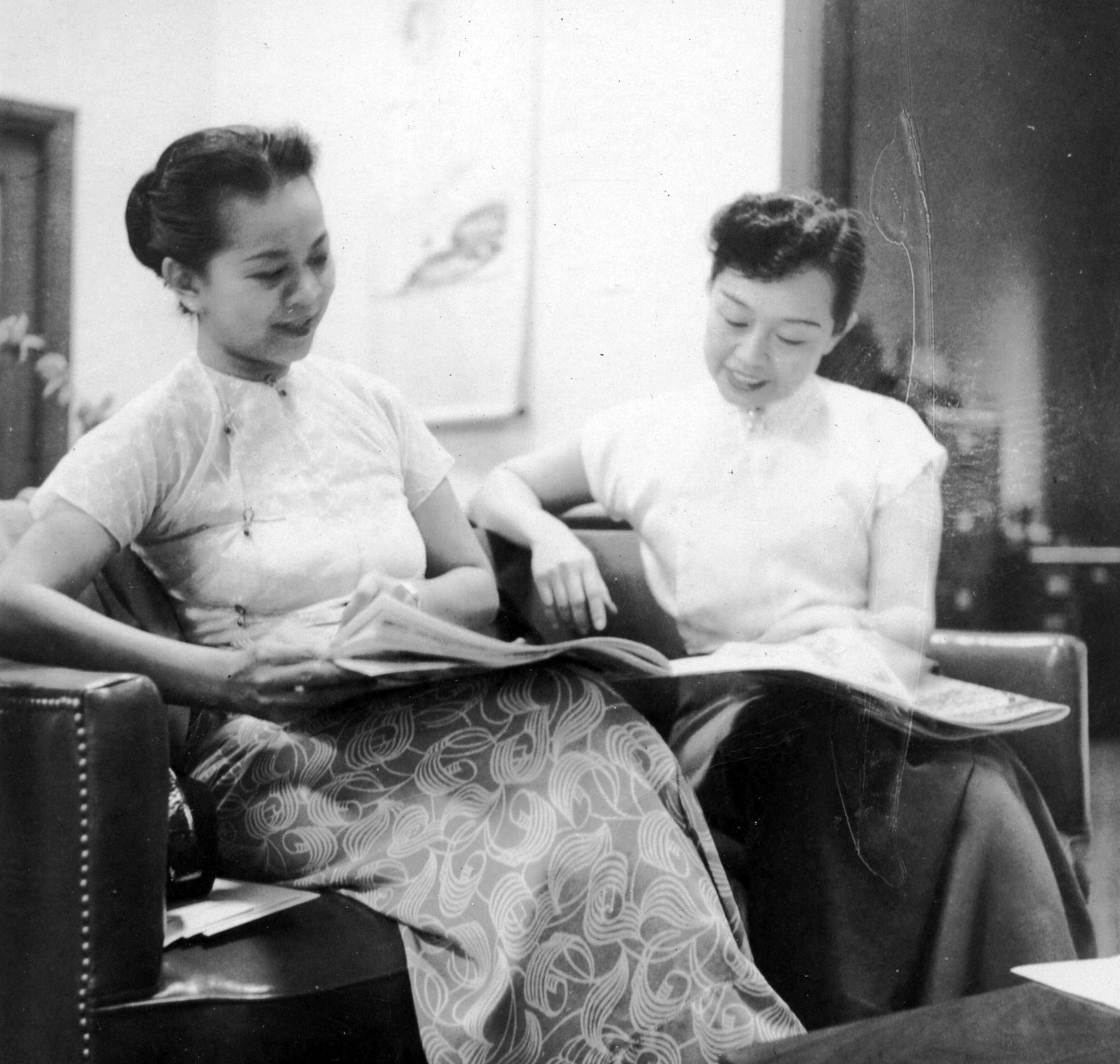
Than E (right) with writer Mi Mi Khaing

The contract was that Than E would record a certain number of songs a year and would be paid a lump sum. There would be no royalties on the sales of the records. She agreed to the terms and recorded a large number of songs written by Shwe Daing Nyunt. Than E used the stage name Bilat Pyan Than or "Than who returned from England." These songs became quite popular among Burmese audiences.

== World War II period broadcaster ==
In the Burma Campaign, Japanese Fifteenth Army launched in an attack into Tenasserim Division (now Thaninthayi Region) in January 1942. Rangoon was bombed by the Japanese warplanes. Than E joined the Women's Auxiliary Service (Burma) (known as WAS(B)), where she was in the motor unit and drove a jeep for officers on official duty. On February 22, 1942, two retreating brigades of the 17th Indian Division were lost due to the premature demolition of the bridge at the Battle of Sittang Bridge.

Realizing Rangoon could not be defended, General Harold Alexander ordered the evacuation of Rangoon after the ports and oil refineries had been destroyed. Than E.'s unit was to retreat to Mandalay and Maymyo (Pyin Oo Lwin). Before they could go there, the Japanese bombers destroyed the trains bound for Taungoo. At the last minute, the high command decided the WAS(B) unit would leave for India on the latest troop ship that brought in reinforcements. Than E's friend Mi Mi Khaing, who had an officer rank, shared a cabin on the ship with Than E. The trip took much longer than usual due to threats of Japanese submarine attacks, but they arrived safely in Calcutta.

Although they were still Wasbees and still under their strict orders, Than E and Mi Mi Khaing took the opportunity to contact the editor of The Statesman. At the time, All India Radio (AIR) was about to begin a new service called External Services to broadcast to countries outside of India and she was offered a job to start up the Burmese language service of the newly established External Services of All India Radio. Her task was to broadcast to territories under Japanese occupation, which included Burma.

During the closing months of 1944, as the Burmese community in New Delhi started to think of returning to Burma, Than E received an offer from the United States Office of War Information (the predecessor of the Voice of America), which coordinated the release of war news for domestic purposes and had launched a large scale information campaign abroad. She was flown from Delhi to New York by military planes and then by trains to San Francisco. She worked there from September 1944 to 14 August 1945 (Victory over Japan Day). The OWI was abolished effective 15 September 1945. She was given tickets to return to New Delhi, but requested a ticket to London instead, which was refused. She decided to stay in Palo Alto, California, with a colleague and her family and she subsequently lectured there.

== International civil servant ==
In January 1947, she found out that a delegation from Burma was in London to discuss the terms of Burma's independence with Clement Attlee's government.

She contacted Tin Tut at the Dorchester and he took her to meet the delegation. That was the first meeting of her with Bogyoke (General) Aung San. Than E later wrote in Freedom from Fear that Bogkyoke met a crowded assembly of Burmese students, expatriates and visitors in a Burmese restaurant and addressed to them and later talked to each of them informally. His unassuming friendliness won their hearts.

At the end of the mission, Bogyoke gave a reception to his English hosts, members of parliament of both parties, journalists, friends of Burma and the Burmese group. Bogyoke requested, in advance, Than E to sing at his reception. Than E sang three songs: one in English, one in French and one in Burmese. She was accompanied by a piano for the English and French songs.

The Burmese song she selected was "Mo Nat Dewi", the lyrics of which were from a love poem written by the Burmese queen Hlaing Hteik Khaung Tin. Bogyoke asked her to return to Burma, saying he could find her a job in Rangoon. Tin Tut thought he would be the first Burmese ambassador from Independent Burma to the United Kingdom. He said Than E would be more useful in London than in Rangoon. Tin Tut was assassinated in September 1948 and Than E struggled to find work before being offered a role by the UN Personnel Officer.

From May 1948 onward she worked at the United Nations Secretariat for 24 years. Her United Nations assignments took her to New Delhi, for an assignment at the United Nations Information Center. She was then transferred to Algiers in the newly independent Algeria to establish a similar center. While she was posted in Algiers, Aung San Suu Kyi visited and stayed with her on her summer vacation from her study at St Hugh's College, Oxford.

Than E was finally assigned at the Secretariat in New York City. When Aung San Suu Kyi worked at the United Nations at the suggestion of Than E, she stayed with Than E for three years, calling her "Auntie Dora" and would refer to her as "my emergency aunt".

== Personal life ==
She married an Austrian documentary filmmaker, Warner Fend.

== Later years ==
After her retirement, Than E went to live in a small town in the Austrian Alps, Feldkirch, Vorarlberg. From there she relocated to an assisted living retirement home in Oxford, United Kingdom in 2001.

She died on June 17, 2007, at the age of 99. At the end of her memorial service, her signature song "Hlay Ka Lay Ko Hlaw Myi" on YouTube was played.
