= David Onllwyn Brace =

Welsh Independent minister (1848–1891)

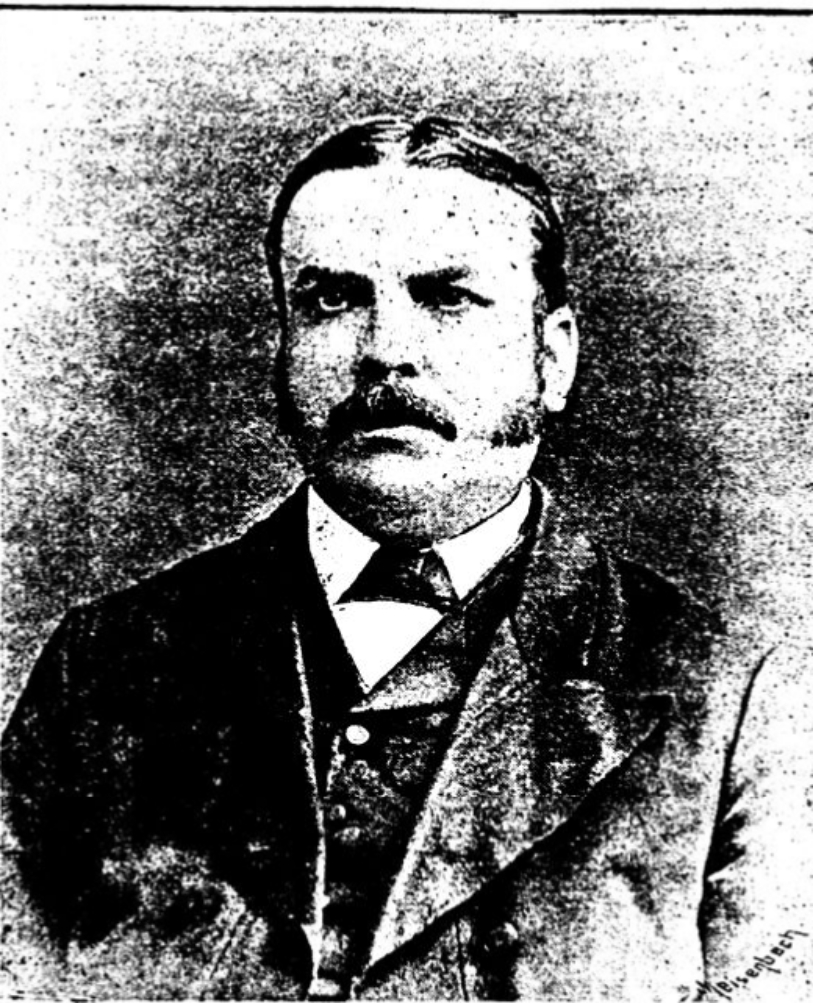

David Onllwyn Brace (1848–1891) was a Welsh Independent minister and elegist. On completing his early schooling (probably in the Onllwyn area), he attended the Independent College, Bala (1866–9), and on 24 October 1870 was ordained priest in Rhos-y-Medre, Denbighshire. In 1872 he moved to the Swansea Valley and held appointments in Felindre and at Bethel, Llan-Twrch, before moving to Bethel, Aberdare.

His published works include; 'Cerddi Onllwyn' (1888), and a volume of love-songs, 'Rachel' (1890).

He died in June 1891.
