= Robbie Brace =

English footballer

Personal information
- Full name: Robert Leon Brace
- Date of birth: 19 December 1964 (age 61)
- Place of birth: Edmonton, England
- Position: Forward

Senior career*
Years	Team	Apps	(Gls)
1982–1984	Tottenham Hotspur	1	(0)
1986–1988	1. FC Saarbrücken	44	(9)
- * Club domestic league appearances and goals

Robert Leon Brace (born 19 December 1964) is an English former professional footballer who played for Tottenham Hotspur and German club 1. FC Saarbrucken.

== Playing career ==
Brace joined Tottenham Hotspur as an apprentice in December 1982. The forward made one first team appearance for the Lilywhites on 7 May 1984 at Southampton in a match that ended in a 5–0 defeat for Tottenham–their biggest defeat at The Dell. Brace went on to play 44 matches for 1. FC Saarbrucken and scoring nine goals for the German club between 1986 and 1988.

== Post–football career ==
Today, Brace works at the Mercedes-Benz plant at Koblenz, and, in addition coaches the local football team; TuS Immendorf.
