= BRAC =

BRAC may stand for:

== Military ==
- Base Realignment and Closure for U.S. military bases
- 1988 Base Realignment and Closure Commission
- 1991 Base Realignment and Closure Commission
- 1993 Base Realignment and Closure Commission
- 1995 Base Realignment and Closure Commission
- 2005 Base Realignment and Closure Commission

== Organizations ==
- BRAC (organisation), an international development organization in Bangladesh
- Brotherhood of Railway and Airline Clerks, a labor union known as the Transportation Communications International Union
- Bureau for the Repression of Communist Activities, Cuban secret police agency
- Building Regulations Advisory Committee, of UK government

== Other ==
- BRAC Bank, a private commercial bank in Bangladesh
- BRAC University, in Bangladesh
- Basic rest-activity cycles of the brain
- Binding and Retrieval in Action Control, a theoretical framework to explain basic psychological functions
- Breath Alcohol Content (BrAC), a measure of alcohol intoxication; see Blood alcohol content § Breath alcohol content
- An alternative specification for countries in the BRIC list: Brazil, Russia, Australia, and Canada or China

== See also ==
- Brac (disambiguation)
- Brač, an island in the Adriatic Sea within Croatia
