= Support =

Support may refer to:

== Arts, entertainment, and media ==
- Supporting character
- Support (art), a solid surface upon which a painting is executed

== Business and finance ==
- Support (technical analysis)
- Child support
- Customer support
- Income Support

== Construction ==
- Support (structure), or lateral support, a type of structural support to help prevent sideways movement
- Structural support, architectural components that include arches, beams, columns, balconies, and stretchers

== Law and politics ==
- Advocacy, in politics, support for constituencies, issues, or legislation
- Lateral and subjacent support, a legal term

== Mathematics ==
=== Mathematics (generally) ===
- Support (mathematics), subset of the domain of a function where it is non-zero valued
- Support (measure theory), a subset of a measurable space
- Supporting hyperplane, sometimes referred to as support
- Support of a module, a set of prime ideals in commutative algebra

=== Statistics ===
- Support, the natural logarithm of the likelihood ratio, as used in phylogenetics
- Method of support, in statistics, a technique that is used to make inferences from datasets
- Support of a distribution where the probability or probability density is positive

== Military ==
- Close air support
- Combat service support
- Combat support
- Fire support

== Psychology ==
- Emotional support animal
- Moral support
- Peer support
- Social support
- Support group
- Sympathy

== Science and technology ==
- Catalyst support, in chemistry and materials science
- Life support, in medicine
- Technical support, help for computer hardware, software, or electronic goods

== See also ==
- Support vessel (disambiguation)
