= William Francis Brace =

American geophysicist (1926–2012)

William Francis Brace (26 August 1926, Littleton, New Hampshire – 2 May 2012) was an American geophysicist.

== Career ==
=== Education ===
Brace matriculated in 1943 at Massachusetts Institute of Technology (MIT), and after 1944–1946 service in the Navy, graduated with bachelor's degrees in 1946 in naval architecture and in 1949 in civil engineering. In 1953 he received his PhD from MIT's department of geology and geophysics. In 1953–1954 he was a Fulbright scholar at Bruno Sander's laboratory in Austria.

=== Work at MIT ===
In 1955 he became an assistant professor at MIT and was from 1976 to 1981 MIT's Cecil and Ida Green Professor of Geology, retiring in 1988 as professor emeritus. From 1981 to 1988 he was the head of MIT's Department of Earth, Atmospheric and Planetary Sciences. At MIT he established a school of quantitative geological rock formation; this school is associated with results such as Byerlee's Law and Brace-Goetze Strength Profiles.

In a watershed study in 1964, Brace demonstrated a causal relationship between shear fracture of rocks and stress-induced micro cracking. Other definitive studies of the dilatancy that occurs during compressive failure have formed a broader basis of understanding of the failure of highly confined materials. With James Byerlee of Stanford University, Brace realized that the stick-slip friction events observed in the laboratory could be used to understand ruptures occurring at much larger scale during destructive earthquakes. In a long and fruitful collaboration with Joseph Walsh of MIT, Brace used careful experiments, thorough mechanical analyses, and thoughtful observations of microstucture to develop a systematic constitutive description of such physical properties of rocks as acoustic wave velocity, electrical resistivity and permeability. ... He often designed and developed new testing apparatus, including the stiff press mentioned above and an internally heated servo-controlled mechanical testing device used to study inelastic behavior of crustal rocks at high temperatures. Brace also pioneered new techniques to study permeability in crystalline rocks, electrical properties of water-saturated rocks under high confining pressure, and the detailed microstructure of ruptured materials using argon-etching techniques. ... With MIT’s Christopher Goetze and other collaborators, Brace showed that data from mechanical tests could be used to produce a simple, quantitative description of the strength of the Earth’s crust.

=== Retirement ===
In his retirement, among other activities, Brace undertook the study of grasses and sedges, particularly in Concord, Massachusetts. Over the course of eight years he documented six sedge species (five of them native) and seven grass species new to Concord.

== Honors ==
Brace was a Guggenheim Fellow for the academic year 1960–1961. He was elected in 1953 a Fellow of the Geological Society of America, in 1963 a Fellow of the American Geophysical Society, and in 1971 a Fellow of the American Academy of Arts and Sciences. In 1971 he was elected a member of the National Academy of Sciences. In 1987 he received the Bucher Medal of the American Geophysical Union and the Distinguished Achievement Award from the U.S. National Committee on Rock Mechanics. MIT established the William F. Brace Lecture Series in his honor.

== Selected publications ==
- with Chris Goetze: Laboratory observations of high temperature rheology of rocks, Tectonophysics, 13, 1972, 583-600 doi:10.1016/0040-1951(72)90039-X
- with David Kohlstedt: Limits on lithospheric stress imposed by laboratory experiments, J. Geophys. Res., 85, 1980, 6248-6252 doi:10.1029/JB085iB11p06248
- with J. D. Byerlee: Stick-slip as a mechanism for earthquakes, Science, vol. 153, 1966, 990-992 doi:10.1126/science.153.3739.990
- with Byerlee: Stick-slip, stable sliding and earthquakes—Effect of rock type, pressure, strain rate and stiffness, J. Geophys. Res., 73, 1968, 6031-6037 doi:10.1029/JB073i018p06031
- with R. M. Stesky, D. Riley, P.-Y. Robin: Friction in faulted rock at high temperature and pressure, Tectonophysics, 23, 1974, 177-203 doi:10.1016/0040-1951(74)90119-X
- with Stesky: Estimation of frictional stress in the San Andreas fault from laboratory measurements, in R. L. Kovach, A. Nur (eds.) Proc. Conf. on the tectonic problems of the San Andreas fault, Stanford University Publ. Geolog. Sci., 12, 1973, 206-214
