= Rick Brace =

Television executive

Rick Brace is the former President of Rogers Media. He used to be the president of Bell Media's specialty channels and CTV Production. He was appointed in October 2002. He had been the president of the network's subsidiary, CTV Specialty Television Inc.

He began his career in 1975 as a technician for the CBC. Brace graduated from Ryerson Polytechnical Institute with a degree in Radio and Television arts.

On 7 July 2015, Rick Brace became the President for the Media Business Unit at Rogers Communications.
