= Hilary Brace =

American artist

- Born: 1956 (age 69–70); Seattle, WA
- Education: Western Washington University; University of California Santa Barbara
- Known for: Charcoal drawings on mylar
- Awards: Guggenheim Fellowship, California Arts Council Fellowship
- Website: hilarybrace.com

"Untitled (09f)2 by Hilary Brace, Charcoal on Mylar

Hilary Brace is an American artist based in Santa Barbara, California, who makes drawings, photographs and prints. Brace is most widely known for her charcoal on Mylar (polyester film) drawings of cloud-inhabited landscapes, which she first exhibited in a solo exhibition in 1997.

== Education and representation ==
Hilary Brace received her MFA degree from the University of California, Santa Barbara, in 1985 and her BFA (1983) and BA degrees (in Painting and Art History) from Western Washington State University in Bellingham, WA. Over the past 25 years Brace has exhibited her work regularly in public institutions and commercial galleries. She is the recipient of numerous national and regional awards, including a Guggenheim Fellowship (2006), National Endowment for the Arts Fellowship (1993), California Arts Council Fellowship (2003), and two grants from the Pollock-Krasner Foundation (1997 and 2005).

Brace's charcoal on Mylar drawings are included in numerous private and public collections including the Boise Art Museum, Nora Eccles Harrison Museum of Art, the Santa Barbara Museum of Art and Western Washington State University Art Museum. Other institutions that have exhibited Brace's drawings include the Weatherspoon Art Museum at the University of North Carolina, Greensboro, NC, Frye Art Museum, Seattle, WA, South Texas Institute of Art, Corpus Christi, TX, Columbus Museum, Columbus GA, Telfair Museum of Art, Savannah, GA, Los Angeles Municipal Art Gallery, Riverside Art Museum, Riverside, CA, and the Schneider Museum of Art, Southern Oregon University, Ashland, OR.

== Charcoal drawings ==
In reviewing Hilary Brace's charcoal on Mylar drawings for the New York Times, Ken Johnson wrote, “once in a while you come across an art of such refined technique that it seems the product of sorcery more than human craft”. Despite the photographic veracity of her technique, Brace composes her images without premeditation, through an explorative process that allows them to unfold in unanticipated directions. Her current smaller, nearly postcard-sized charcoal drawings, along with her earlier charcoals, are made in a reductive manner by first darkening the entire surface with charcoal and then removing the medium with various hand-made tools, allowing the image to emerge through chance and intuition. For works of somewhat larger scale, greater complexity and more refined technique, Brace creates studies in a similarly explorative manner while she refers to photographs of sculptural tableaus and other diverse means of garnering information. Consequently, these recent works are more deceptively photographic.

"Brace’s fictional spaces depict nameless, placeless spectacles staged by clouds but suggesting such continuity between states of matter - solid, liquid and gaseous – that they are equally convincing as skyscapes, seascapes or sometimes landscapes." In Brace's words, as a drawing develops, the image "moves from vague suggestion to refinement as a remote, nascent world takes on a clear and obtainable presence." Writing for the Los Angeles Times, Christopher Knight stated that “the feeling is less one of romantic yearning for something up there, out of reach, than it is full immersion in something stunning, primordial and elusive but immediately at hand.” Despite their small scale, as Leah Ollman observed in Art in America, these drawings “suggest a vastness at the opposite end of the experiential spectrum, scaled more to the imagination than to the body. What Brace’s stunning little drawings do is put those two realms– the private and the cosmic – within reach of each other.”

== Photographs ==
Brace's photographs of sculptural tableau, which she began producing in 2005, have been exhibited in a number of Southern California venues, including a solo exhibition at Craig Krull Gallery and are held in the collection of the Santa Barbara Museum of Art.
