= Joab Brace =

American minister

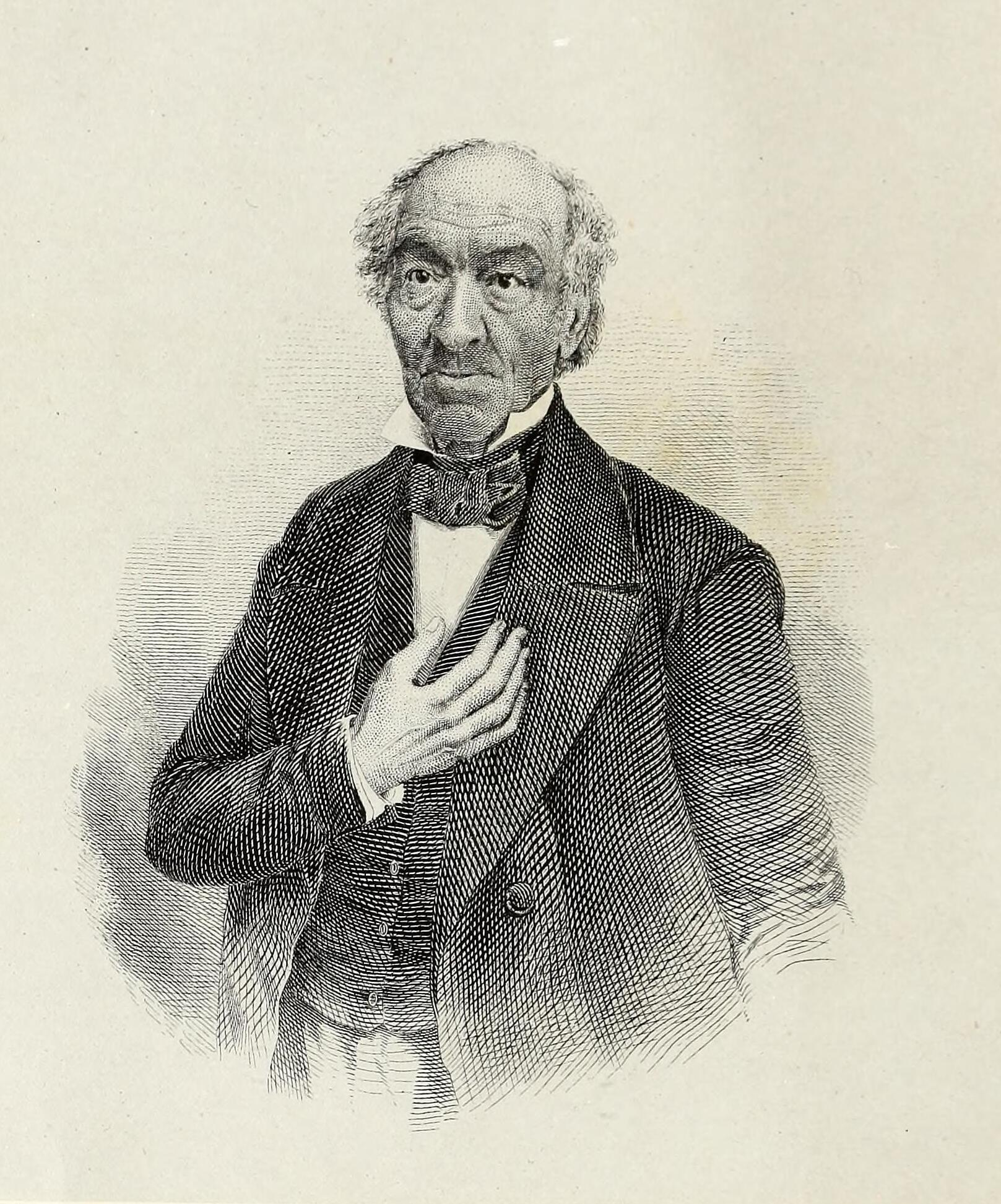
Joab Brace, D.D.

Joab Brace (June 13, 1781 – April 20, 1861) was an American Congregationalist minister.

He was the son of Zenas and Mary (Skinner) Brace, and was born in West Hartford, Connecticut, June 13, 1781. He graduated from Yale University in 1804. He studied theology, was licensed to preach and on the January 16, 1805, he was ordained and installed pastor of the congregational church in the parish of Newington, in the town of Wethersfield, Connecticut, and there continued until he had completed fifty years of active and useful service as pastor. He married Miss Lucy Collins, of West Hartford, Conn., January 21, 1805, and had six children. On the January 16, 1855, he delivered a half-century discourse, reviewing the history of the church and society from the earliest times. This discourse has been printed. (Hartford 1855, pp 75, 8vo.)

In 1854 he received the degree of Doctor of Divinity from Williams College. Still retaining a nominal connection with his parish, he removed to Pittsfield, Massachusetts, where, in the family of his son-in-law, the Rev. J. Todd, he passed happily the last six years of his life.

== Publications ==
- History of the church in Newington: its doctrine, its ministers, its experience
