= Bilateral =

Bilateral may refer to any concept including two sides, in particular:

- Bilateria, bilateral animals
- Bilateralism, the political and cultural relations between two states
- Bilateral, occurring on both sides of an organism (Anatomical terms of location § Medial and lateral)
- Bilateral symmetry, symmetry between two sides of an organism
- Bilateral filter, an image processing algorithm
- Bilateral amplifier, a type of amplifier
- Bilateral (album), an album by the band Leprous
- Bilateral school, see Partially selective school (England)
