= Lateral and subjacent support =

Concept in land law

Lateral and subjacent support, in the law of property, describes the right a landowner has to have that land physically supported in its natural state by both adjoining land and underground structures. If a neighbor's excavation or excessive extraction of underground liquid deposits (crude oil or aquifers) causes subsidence, such as by causing the landowner's land to cave in, the neighbor will be subject to strict liability in a tort action. The neighbor will also be strictly liable for damage to buildings on the landowner's property if the landowner can show that the weight of the buildings did not contribute to the collapse of the land. If the landowner is unable to make such a showing, the neighbor must be shown to have been negligent in order for the landowner to recover damages.

If the landowner owns everything beneath the ground on his property, he may convey to another party the rights to mineral deposits under the land and other things requiring excavation, such as easements for buried conduits or for water wells. However, such a conveyance requires the recipient to prevent any damage to the surface of the land caused by the excavation unless the conveyance itself grants express authority for the surface land to be damaged, "as reasonably necessary" for the recipient to exercise his extraction rights.
