= Lateral release (surgery) =

- Specialty: Orthopedic

A lateral release is a surgical procedure to release tight capsular structures (lateral retinaculum) on the outer aspect (lateral aspect) of the kneecap (patella). This is usually performed because of knee pain related to the kneecap being pulled over to the outer (lateral) side and not being able to run properly in the centre of the groove of the femur bone as the knee bends and straightens. The procedure is also known as a 'lateral retinacular release'.

Amongst experienced knee surgeons with a special interest in diseases of the patellofemoral articulation, isolated lateral release is rarely performed. Strong consensus was found that isolated lateral release should not be undertaken without prior planning in the form of objective clinical indications and preoperative informed consent.
