= List of ICD-9 codes 390–459: diseases of the circulatory system =

ICD-9 chapters
Chapter	Block	Title
I	001–139	Infectious and Parasitic Diseases
II	140–239	Neoplasms
III	240–279	Endocrine, Nutritional and Metabolic Diseases, and Immunity Disorders
IV	280–289	Diseases of the Blood and Blood-forming Organs
V	290–319	Mental Disorders
VI	320–389	Diseases of the Nervous System and Sense Organs
VII	390–459	Diseases of the Circulatory System
VIII	460–519	Diseases of the Respiratory System
IX	520–579	Diseases of the Digestive System
X	580–629	Diseases of the Genitourinary System
XI	630–679	Complications of Pregnancy, Childbirth, and the Puerperium
XII	680–709	Diseases of the Skin and Subcutaneous Tissue
XIII	710–739	Diseases of the Musculoskeletal System and Connective Tissue
XIV	740–759	Congenital Anomalies
XV	760–779	Certain Conditions originating in the Perinatal Period
XVI	780–799	Symptoms, Signs and Ill-defined Conditions
XVII	800–999	Injury and Poisoning
	E800–E999	Supplementary Classification of External Causes of Injury and Poisoning
	V01–V82	Supplementary Classification of Factors influencing Health Status and Contact with Health Services
	M8000–M9970	Morphology of Neoplasms

This is a shortened version of the seventh chapter of the ICD-9: Diseases of the Circulatory System. It covers ICD codes 259 to 282. The full chapter can be found on pages 215 to 258 of Volume 1, which contains all (sub)categories of the ICD-9. Volume 2 is an alphabetical index of Volume 1. Both volumes can be downloaded for free from the website of the World Health Organization.

== Acute rheumatic fever (390–392) ==
- 390 Rheumatic fever without mention of heart involvement
- 391 Rheumatic fever with heart involvement
  - 391.9 Rheumatic heart disease, unspec.
- 392 Rheumatic chorea

== Chronic rheumatic heart disease (393–398) ==
- 393 Chronic rheumatic pericarditis
- 394 Diseases of mitral valve
  - 394.0 Mitral stenosis
  - 394.1 Rheumatic mitral insufficiency
  - 394.2 Mitral stenosis with insufficiency
  - 394.9 Other and unspecified
- 395 Diseases of aortic valve
  - 395.0 Rheumatic aortic stenosis
  - 395.1 Rheumatic aortic insufficiency
  - 395.2 Rheumatic aortic stenosis with insufficiency
  - 395.9 Other and unspecified
- 396 Diseases of mitral and aortic valves
- 397 Diseases of other endocardial structures
  - 397.0 Diseases of tricuspid valve
  - 397.1 Rheumatic diseases of pulmonary valve
  - 397.9 Rheumatic diseases of endocardium, valve unspecified
- 398 Other rheumatic heart disease
  - 398.0 Rheumatic myocarditis
  - 398.9 Other and unspecified

== Hypertensive disease (401–405) ==
- 401 Essential hypertension
  - 401.0 Hypertension, malignant
  - 401.1 Hypertension, benign
  - 401.9 Hypertension, unspecified
- 402 Hypertensive heart disease
- 403 Hypertensive renal disease
  - 403.0 Malignant hypertensive renal disease
  - 403.1 Benign hypertensive renal disease
- 404 Hypertensive heart and renal disease
- 405 Secondary hypertension
  - 405.0 Malignant secondary hypertension
    - 405.01 Hypertension, renovascular, malignant
  - 405.1 Benign secondary hypertension
    - 405.11 Hypertension, renovascular, benign

== Ischemic heart disease (410–414) ==
- 410 Acute myocardial infarction
  - 410.0 MI, acute, anterolateral
  - 410.1 MI, acute, anterior, NOS
  - 410.2 MI, acute, inferolateral
  - 410.3 MI, acute, inferoposterior
  - 410.4 MI, acute, other inferior wall, NOS
  - 410.5 MI, acute, other lateral wall
  - 410.6 MI, acute, true posterior
  - 410.7 MI, acute, subendocardial
  - 410.8 MI, acute, spec.
  - 410.9 MI, acute, unspec.
- 411 Other acute and subacute forms of ischemic heart disease
  - 411.0 Postmyocardial infarction syndrome
  - 411.1 Intermediate coronary syndrome
- 412 Old myocardial infarction
- 413 Angina pectoris
  - 413.0 Angina decubitus
  - 413.1 Prinzmetal angina
- 414 Other forms of chronic ischemic heart disease
  - 414.0 Coronary atherosclerosis
  - 414.1 Aneurysm and dissection of heart
    - 414.10 Aneurysm of heart (wall)
    - 414.11 Aneurysm of coronary vessels
    - 414.12 Dissection of coronary artery
  - 414.8 Ischemic heart disease, chronic, other
  - 414.9 Ischemic heart disease, chronic, unspec.

== Diseases of pulmonary circulation (415–417) ==
- 415 Acute pulmonary heart disease
  - 415.0 Acute cor pulmonale
  - 415.1 Pulmonary embolism and infarction
    - 415.11 Iatrogenic pulmonary embolism and infarction
    - 415.12 Septic pulmonary embolism
  - 415.19 Other pulmonary embolism and infarction
- 416 Chronic pulmonary heart disease
  - 416.0 Primary pulmonary hypertension
  - 416.1 Kyphoscoliotic heart disease
  - 416.2 Chronic pulmonary embolism
  - 416.8 Other chronic pulmonary heart diseases
  - 416.9 Chronic pulmonary heart disease unspecified
- 417 Other diseases of pulmonary circulation
  - 417.0 Arteriovenous fistula of pulmonary vessels
  - 417.1 Aneurysm of pulmonary artery
  - 417.8 Other specified diseases of pulmonary circulation
  - 417.9 Unspecified disease of pulmonary circulation

== Other forms of heart disease (420–429) ==
- 420 Acute pericarditis
  - 420.9 Other and unspecified acute pericarditis
    - 420.91 Pericarditis, acute, nonspecific
- 421 Acute and subacute endocarditis
  - 421.0 Endocarditis, acute, bacterial
- 422 Acute myocarditis
  - 422.9 Other and unspecified acute myocarditis
    - 422.91 Myocarditis, idiopathic
- 423 Other diseases of pericardium
- 424 Other diseases of endocardium
  - 424.0 Valvular disorder, mitral, NOS
  - 424.1 Valvular disorder, aortic, NOS
  - 424.2 Valvular disorder, tricuspid, NOS
  - 424.3 Valvular disorder, pulmonic, NOS
- 425 Cardiomyopathy
  - 425.0 Endomyocardial fibrosis
  - 425.1 Hypertrophic obstructive cardiomyopathy
  - 425.2 Obscure cardiomyopathy of africa
  - 425.3 Endocardial fibroelastosis
  - 425.4 Other primary cardiomyopathies
  - 425.5 Alcoholic cardiomyopathy
  - 425.7 Nutritional and metabolic cardiomyopathy
  - 425.8 Cardiomyopathy in other diseases classified elsewhere
  - 425.9 Secondary cardiomyopathy unspecified
- 426 Conduction disorders
  - 426.0 Atrioventricular block, third degree
    - 426.11 Atrioventricular block, first degree
    - 426.12 Atrioventricular block, Mobitz II
    - 426.13 Atrioventricular block, Wenckebach's
  - 426.3 Bundle branch block, left
  - 426.4 Bundle branch block, right
  - 426.6 Sinoatrial heart block
  - 426.7 Atrioventricular excitation, anomalous
    - Wolff-Parkinson-White syndrome
- 427 Cardiac dysrhythmias
  - 427.0 Tachycardia, paroxysmal supraventricular
  - 427.3 Atrial fibrillation and flutter
    - 427.31 Atrial fibrillation
    - 427.32 Atrial flutter
  - 427.4 Ventricular fibrillation and flutter
    - 427.41 Ventricular fibrillation
  - 427.5 Cardiac arrest
  - 427.6 Premature beats, unspec.
  - 427.8 Other specified cardiac dysrhythmias
    - 427.81 Sick sinus syndrome
    - 427.89 Sinus bradycardia, NOS
  - 427.9 Cardiac dysrhythmia unspecified
    - Gallop rhythm
- 428 Heart failure
  - 428.0 Congestive heart failure unspecified
  - 428.1 Left heart failure
    - Pulmonary edema, acute
  - 428.2 Systolic heart failure
  - 428.3 Diastolic heart failure
  - 428.4 Heart failure, combined, unspec.
- 429 Ill-defined descriptions and complications of heart disease
  - 429.0 Myocarditis unspecified
  - 429.1 Myocardial degeneration
  - 429.2 Cardiovascular disease unspecified
  - 429.3 Cardiomegaly
  - 429.4 Functional disturbances following cardiac surgery
  - 429.5 Rupture of chordae tendineae
  - 429.6 Rupture of papillary muscle
  - 429.7 Certain sequelae of myocardial infarction not elsewhere classified
    - 429.71 Certain sequelae of myocardial infarction not elsewhere classified acquired cardiac septal defect
    - 429.79 Certain sequelae of myocardial infarction not elsewhere classified other
  - 429.8 Other ill-defined heart diseases
    - 429.81 Other disorders of papillary muscle
    - 429.82 Hyperkinetic heart disease
    - 429.83 Takotsubo syndrome
    - 429.89 Other ill-defined heart diseases
  - 429.9 Heart disease unspecified

== Cerebrovascular disease (430–438) ==
- 430 Subarachnoid hemorrhage
- 431 Intracerebral hemorrhage
- 432 Other and unspecified intracranial hemorrhage
  - 432.9 Hemorrhage, intracranial, NOS
- 433 Occlusion and stenosis of precerebral arteries
  - 433.0 Occlusion and stenosis of basilar artery
  - 433.1 Occlusion and stenosis of carotid artery
  - 433.2 Occlusion and stenosis of vertebral artery
- 434 Occlusion of cerebral arteries
  - 434.0 Cerebral thrombosis
    - 434.00 Cerebral thrombosis without cerebral infarction
    - 434.01 Cerebral thrombosis with cerebral infarction
  - 434.1 Cerebral embolism
    - 434.10 Cerebral embolism without cerebral infarction
    - 434.11 Cerebral embolism with cerebral infarction
- 435 Transient cerebral ischemia
  - 435.0 Basilar artery syndrome
  - 435.1 Vertebral artery syndrome
  - 435.2 Subclavian steal syndrome
  - 435.3 Vertebrobasilar artery syndrome
  - 435.9 Transient ischemic attack, unspec.
- 436 Acute but ill-defined cerebrovascular disease
- 437 Other and ill-defined cerebrovascular disease
  - 437.0 Cerebral atherosclerosis
  - 437.1 Other generalized ischemic cerebrovascular disease
  - 437.2 Hypertensive encephalopathy
  - 437.3 Cerebral aneurysm nonruptured
  - 437.4 Cerebral arteritis
  - 437.5 Moyamoya disease
  - 437.6 Nonpyogenic thrombosis of intracranial venous sinus
  - 437.7 Transient global amnesia
- 438 Late effects of cerebrovascular disease
  - 438.0 Cognitive deficits
  - 438.1 Speech and language deficits
    - 438.10 Speech and language deficits, unspecified
    - 438.11 Aphasia
    - 438.12 Dysphasia
    - 438.19 Other speech and language deficits
  - 438.2 Hemiplegia/hemiparesis
    - 438.20 Hemiplegia affecting unspecified side
    - 438.21 Hemiplegia affecting dominant side
    - 438.22 Hemiplegia affecting nondominant side
  - 438.3 Monoplegia of upper limb
  - 438.4 Monoplegia of lower limb
  - 438.5 Other paralytic syndrome
  - 438.8 Other late effects of cerebrovascular disease
    - 438.81 Apraxia cerebrovascular disease
    - 438.82 Dysphagia cerebrovascular disease
    - 438.83 Facial weakness
    - 438.84 Ataxia
    - 438.85 Vertigo
  - 438.9 CVA, late effect, unspec.

== Diseases of arteries, arterioles, and capillaries (440–449) ==
- 440 Atherosclerosis
  - 440.1 Stenosis of renal artery
  - 440.2 Peripheral Arterial Disease
    - 440.21 Peripheral Arterial Disease with Intermittent Claudication (Also Claudication)
    - 440.23 Peripheral Arterial Disease w/ ulceration
- 441 Aortic aneurysm and dissection
  - 441.0 Aortic Dissection
  - 441.3 Abdominal Aortic Aneurysm, ruptured
  - 441.4 Abdominal aortic Aneurysm, w/o rupture
  - 441.9 Abdominal Aortic Aneurysm, unspecified
- 442 Other aneurysm
- 443 Other peripheral vascular disease
  - 443.0 Raynaud's syndrome
  - 443.1 Thromboangiitis obliterans [Buerger's disease]
  - 443.2 Other arterial dissection
    - 443.21 Dissection of carotid artery
    - 443.22 Dissection of iliac artery
    - 443.23 Dissection of renal artery
    - 443.24 Dissection of vertebral artery
    - 443.29 Dissection of other artery
  - 443.8 Other specified peripheral vascular diseases
    - 443.82 Erythromelalgia
  - 443.9 Peripheral vascular disease, unspecified
- 444 Arterial embolism and thrombosis
- 445 Atheroembolism
- 446 Polyarteritis nodosa and allied conditions
  - 446.1 Kawasaki disease / Acute febrile mucocutaneous lymph node syndrome
  - 446.5 Giant Cell arteritis(Temporal Arteritis)
- 447 Other disorders of arteries and arterioles
  - 447.0 Arteriovenous fistula acquired
- 448 Disease of capillaries
- 449 Septic arterial embolism

== Diseases of veins and lymphatics, and other diseases of circulatory system (451–459) ==
- 451 Phlebitis and thrombophlebitis
  - 451.1 Of deep vessels of lower extremities
    - 451.11 Deep vein thrombosis, femoral
    - 451.19 Deep vein thrombosis, other leg veins
  - 451.8 Of other sites
    - 451.82 Phlebitis, superficial veins, upper extrem.
  - 451.9 Thrombophlebitis, unspec.
- 452 Portal vein thrombosis
- 453 Other venous embolism and thrombosis
  - 453.4 Deep vein thrombosis, unspec.
    - 453.41 Deep vein thrombosis, proximal
    - 453.42 Deep vein thrombosis, distal
  - 453.9 Venous embolism, unspec. site
- 454 Varicose veins of lower extremities
  - 454.0 Varicose veins w/ ulcer
  - 454.1 Varicose veins w/ inflammation
  - 454.2 Varicose veins w/ulcer, inflammation
  - 454.9 Varicose veins, asymptomatic
- 455 Hemorrhoids
  - 455.0 Hemorrhoids, internal w/o complication
  - 455.2 Hemorrhoids, internal w/ complication
  - 455.3 Hemorrhoids, external w/o complication
  - 455.4 Hemorrhoids, external thrombosed
  - 455.6 Hemorrhoids, NOS
- 456 Varicose veins of other sites
  - 456.0 Esophageal varices w/ bleeding
  - 456.1 Esophageal varices w/o bleeding
  - 456.4 Varicocele
- 457 Noninfective disorders of lymphatic channels
  - 457.0 Postmastectomy lymphedema syndrome
- 458 Hypotension
  - 458.0 Orthostatic hypotension
  - 458.2 Iatrogenic hypotension
- 459 Other disorders of circulatory system
  - 459.8 Other specified disorders of circulatory system
    - 459.81 Venous insufficiency, unspec.
