= List of ICD-9 codes 740–759: congenital anomalies =

ICD-9 chapters
Chapter	Block	Title
I	001–139	Infectious and Parasitic Diseases
II	140–239	Neoplasms
III	240–279	Endocrine, Nutritional and Metabolic Diseases, and Immunity Disorders
IV	280–289	Diseases of the Blood and Blood-forming Organs
V	290–319	Mental Disorders
VI	320–389	Diseases of the Nervous System and Sense Organs
VII	390–459	Diseases of the Circulatory System
VIII	460–519	Diseases of the Respiratory System
IX	520–579	Diseases of the Digestive System
X	580–629	Diseases of the Genitourinary System
XI	630–679	Complications of Pregnancy, Childbirth, and the Puerperium
XII	680–709	Diseases of the Skin and Subcutaneous Tissue
XIII	710–739	Diseases of the Musculoskeletal System and Connective Tissue
XIV	740–759	Congenital Anomalies
XV	760–779	Certain Conditions originating in the Perinatal Period
XVI	780–799	Symptoms, Signs and Ill-defined Conditions
XVII	800–999	Injury and Poisoning
	E800–E999	Supplementary Classification of External Causes of Injury and Poisoning
	V01–V82	Supplementary Classification of Factors influencing Health Status and Contact with Health Services
	M8000–M9970	Morphology of Neoplasms

This is a shortened version of the fourteenth chapter of the ICD-9: Congenital Anomalies. It covers ICD codes 740 to 759. The full chapter can be found on pages 417 to 437 of Volume 1, which contains all (sub)categories of the ICD-9. Volume 2 is an alphabetical index of Volume 1. Both volumes can be downloaded for free from the website of the World Health Organization.

== Nervous system (740–742) ==
- 740 Anencephalus and similar anomalies
  - 740.0 Anencephalus
- 741 Spina bifida
- 742 Other congenital anomalies of nervous system
  - 742.1 Microcephalus
  - 742.3 Hydrocephalus

== Eye, ear, face and neck (743–744) ==
- 743 Congenital anomalies of eye
  - 743.0 Anophthalmos
    - 743.00 Clinical anophthalmos unspecified
    - 743.03 Cystic eyeball congenital
    - 743.06 Cryptophthalmos
  - 743.1 Microphthalmos
  - 743.2 Buphthalmos
  - 743.3 Congenital cataract and lens anomalies
  - 743.4 Coloboma and other anomalies of anterior segment
    - 743.45 Aniridia
  - 743.5 Congenital anomalies of posterior segment
  - 743.6 Congenital anomalies of eyelids, lacrimal system, and orbit
- 744 Congenital anomalies of ear, face, and neck
  - 744.0 Anomalies of ear causing impairment of hearing
  - 744.1 Accessory auricle
  - 744.2 Other specified congenital anomalies of ear
    - 744.22 Macrotia
    - 744.23 Microtia
  - 744.3 Unspecified congenital anomaly of ear
  - 744.4 Branchial cleft cyst or fistula; preauricular sinus
  - 744.5 Webbing of neck
  - 744.8 Other specified congenital anomalies of face and neck
    - 744.81 Macrocheilia
    - 744.82 Microcheilia
    - 744.83 Macrostomia
    - 744.84 Microstomia

== Circulatory system (745–747) ==
- 745 Bulbus cordis anomalies and anomalies of cardiac septal closure
  - 745.0 Common truncus
  - 745.1 Transposition of great vessels
  - 745.2 Tetralogy of fallot
  - 745.3 Common ventricle
  - 745.4 Ventricular septal defect
  - 745.5 Atrial septal defect
  - 745.6 Endocardial cushion defects
  - 745.7 Cor biloculare
- 746 Other congenital anomalies of heart
  - 746.1 Tricuspid atresia and stenosis congenital
  - 746.2 Ebstein's anomaly
  - 746.3 Congenital stenosis of aortic valve
  - 746.4 Congenital insufficiency of aortic valve
  - 746.5 Congenital mitral stenosis
  - 746.6 Congenital mitral insufficiency
  - 746.7 Hypoplastic left heart syndrome
  - 746.8 Other specified congenital anomalies of heart
    - 746.81 Subaortic stenosis congenital
    - 746.82 Cor triatriatum
    - 746.83 Infundibular pulmonic stenosis congenital
    - 746.84 Congenital obstructive anomalies of heart not elsewhere classified
    - 746.85 Coronary artery anomaly congenital
    - 746.86 Congenital heart block
    - 746.87 Malposition of heart and cardiac apex
    - 746.89 Other specified congenital anomalies of heart
      - Brugada syndrome
- 747 Other congenital anomalies of circulatory system
  - 747.1 Coarctation of aorta
    - 747.11 Interruption of aortic arch
  - 747.2 Other congenital anomalies of aorta
  - 747.3 Congenital anomalies of pulmonary artery
  - 747.4 Congenital anomalies of great veins
  - 747.5 Absence or hypoplasia of umbilical artery
  - 747.6 Arteriovenous malformation, unspec.
  - 747.8 Other specified anomalies of circulatory system
    - 747.81 Congenital anomalies of cerebrovascular system
    - 747.82 Spinal vessel anomaly
    - 747.83 Persistent fetal circulation
  - 747.9 Unspecified congenital anomaly of circulatory system

== Respiratory system (748–748) ==
- 748 Congenital anomalies of respiratory system
  - 748.0 Choanal atresia

== Digestive system (749–751) ==
- 749 Cleft palate
  - 749.0 Cleft palate, unspec.
  - 749.2 Cleft palate w/ cleft lip
- 750 Other congenital anomalies of upper alimentary tract
  - 750.0 Tongue tie
  - 750.1 Other congenital anomalies of tongue
  - 750.2 Other specified congenital anomalies of mouth and pharynx
  - 750.3 Congenital tracheoesophageal fistula esophageal atresia and stenosis
  - 750.4 Other specified congenital anomalies of esophagus
  - 750.5 Congenital hypertrophic pyloric stenosis
  - 750.6 Congenital hiatus hernia
  - 750.7 Other specified congenital anomalies of stomach
  - 750.8 Other specified congenital anomalies of upper alimentary tract
  - 750.9 Unspecified congenital anomaly of upper alimentary tract
- 751 Other congenital anomalies of digestive system
  - 751.0 Meckel's diverticulum
  - 751.1 Congenital atresia and stenosis of small intestine
  - 751.2 Imperforate anus
  - 751.3 Hirschsprung's disease
  - 751.4 Congenital anomalies of intestinal fixation
  - 751.5 Other congenital anomalies of intestine
  - 751.6 Anomalies of gallbladder bile ducts and liver
  - 751.7 Congenital anomalies of pancreas
  - 751.8 Other specified congenital anomalies of digestive system
  - 751.9 Unspecified congenital anomaly of digestive system

== Genital organs (752–752) ==
- 752 Congenital anomalies of genital organs
  - 752.0 Congenital anomalies of ovaries
  - 752.1 Congenital anomalies of fallopian tubes and broad ligaments
  - 752.2 Doubling of uterus
  - 752.3 Other congenital anomalies of uterus
  - 752.4 Anomalies of cervix, vagina, and external female genitalia
    - 752.42 Imperforate hymen
    - 752.43 Cervical agenesis
  - 752.5 Undescended testicle
  - 752.6 Hypospadias and epispadias
    - 752.61 Hypospadias
    - 752.62 Epispadias
    - 752.63 Congenital chordee
    - 752.64 Micropenis
  - 752.7 Indeterminate sex and pseudohermaphroditism

== Urinary system (753–753) ==
- 753 Congenital anomalies of urinary system
  - 753.0 Renal agenesis and dysgenesis
  - 753.1 Cystic kidney disease
  - 753.2 Obstructive defects of renal pelvis and ureter
  - 753.3 Other specified anomalies of kidney
    - Renal ectopia
    - Horseshoe kidney
  - 753.4 Other specified anomalies of ureter
    - Ectopic ureter
  - 753.5 Exstrophy of urinary bladder
  - 753.6 Atresia and stenosis of urethra and bladder neck
  - 753.7 Anomalies of urachus
    - Urachal cyst
  - 753.8 Other specified anomalies of bladder and urethra
  - 753.9 Unspecified anomaly of urinary system

== Musculoskeletal system (754–756) ==
- 754 Certain congenital musculoskeletal deformities
  - 754.1 Torticollis, sternomastoid
  - 754.3 Dislocation of hip, unilateral
  - 754.5 Varus deformities of feet
    - 754.51 Talipes equinovarus
  - 754.6 Valgus deformities of feet
  - 754.8 Other specified nonteratogenic anomalies
    - 754.81 Pectus excavatum
- 755 Other congenital anomalies of limbs
  - 755.0 Polydactyly
  - 755.1 Syndactyly
  - 755.5 Other congenital anomalies of upper limb including shoulder girdle
    - 755.54 Madelung's deformity
    - 755.55 Acrocephalosyndactyly
      - Apert syndrome
  - 755.9 Limb anomaly, unspec.
- 756 Other congenital musculoskeletal anomalies
  - 756.1 Anomalies of spine
    - 756.12 Spondylolisthesis
    - 756.16 Klippel–Feil syndrome
    - 756.17 Spina bifida occulta
  - 756.2 Cervical rib
  - 756.3 Other congenital anomalies of ribs and sternum
  - 756.4 Chondrodystrophy
  - 756.5 Osteodystrophies
    - 756.51 Osteogenesis imperfecta
  - 756.6 Congenital anomalies of diaphragm
  - 756.7 Congenital anomalies of abdominal wall
  - 756.8 Other specified congenital anomalies of muscle tendon fascia and connective tissue
    - 756.81 Congenital absence of muscle and tendon
    - 756.82 Accessory muscle
    - 756.83 Ehlers–Danlos syndrome

== Integument (757–757) ==
- 757 Congenital anomalies of the integument
  - 757.3 Other specified anomalies of skin
    - 757.32 Birthmarks
    - 757.39 Other specified congenital anomalies of skin
      - Bloom syndrome
      - Epidermolysis bullosa
      - Pseudoxanthoma elasticum
  - 757.6 Supernumerary nipple

== Chromosomal anomalies (758–758) ==
- 758 Chromosomal anomalies
  - 758.0 Down syndrome
  - 758.1 Patau's syndrome
  - 758.2 Edward's syndrome
  - 758.3 Autosomal deletion syndromes
    - 758.31 Cri du chat syndrome
    - 758.32 Velo-cardio-facial syndrome
    - 758.33 Other microdeletions
      - Miller–Dieker syndrome
      - Smith–Magenis syndrome
  - 758.4 Balanced autosomal translocation in normal individual
  - 758.5 Other conditions due to autosomal anomalies
  - 758.6 Gonadal dysgenesis
    - Turner syndrome
    - XO syndrome
  - 758.7 Klinefelter syndrome
  - 758.8 Other conditions due to sex chromosome anomalies
    - Snyder–Robinson syndrome (SRS)
  - 758.9 Conditions due to anomaly of unspecified chromosome

== Other (759–759) ==
- 759 Other and unspecified congenital anomalies
  - 759.0 Anomalies of spleen, congenital
  - 759.1 Anomalies of adrenal gland, congenital
  - 759.2 Anomalies of other endocrine glands, congenital
  - 759.3 Situs inversus
  - 759.4 Conjoined twins
  - 759.5 Tuberous sclerosis
  - 759.6 Other congenital hamartoses, not elsewhere classified
    - Cowden syndrome
  - 759.7 Multiple congenital anomalies, so described
  - 759.8 Other specified congenital anomalies
    - 759.81 Prader-Willi syndrome
    - 759.82 Marfan syndrome
    - 759.83 Fragile X syndrome
    - 759.89 Other specified congenital anomalies
  - 759.9 Congenital anomaly, unspecified
