= List of ICD-9 codes 320–389: diseases of the nervous system and sense organs =

ICD-9 chapters
Chapter	Block	Title
I	001–139	Infectious and Parasitic Diseases
II	140–239	Neoplasms
III	240–279	Endocrine, Nutritional and Metabolic Diseases, and Immunity Disorders
IV	280–289	Diseases of the Blood and Blood-forming Organs
V	290–319	Mental Disorders
VI	320–389	Diseases of the Nervous System and Sense Organs
VII	390–459	Diseases of the Circulatory System
VIII	460–519	Diseases of the Respiratory System
IX	520–579	Diseases of the Digestive System
X	580–629	Diseases of the Genitourinary System
XI	630–679	Complications of Pregnancy, Childbirth, and the Puerperium
XII	680–709	Diseases of the Skin and Subcutaneous Tissue
XIII	710–739	Diseases of the Musculoskeletal System and Connective Tissue
XIV	740–759	Congenital Anomalies
XV	760–779	Certain Conditions originating in the Perinatal Period
XVI	780–799	Symptoms, Signs and Ill-defined Conditions
XVII	800–999	Injury and Poisoning
	E800–E999	Supplementary Classification of External Causes of Injury and Poisoning
	V01–V82	Supplementary Classification of Factors influencing Health Status and Contact with Health Services
	M8000–M9970	Morphology of Neoplasms

This is a shortened version of the sixth chapter of the ICD-9: Diseases of the Nervous System and Sense Organs. It covers ICD codes 320 to 389. The full chapter can be found on pages 215 to 258 of Volume 1, which contains all (sub)categories of the ICD-9. Volume 2 is an alphabetical index of Volume 1. Both volumes can be downloaded for free from the website of the World Health Organization.

In the ICD-9 system, a disease may have a cause listed in one chapter, and its manifestations listed in another. For example, Tuberculous meningitis is caused by a bacterial infection, and is therefore listed in Chapter 1, Infectious and parasitic diseases. However, as it results in a disorder of the nervous system, it is also listed in this chapter. An asterisk (*) means that a disease has an underlying cause which can be found elsewhere in the ICD. A code referring to such an underlying cause may be right next to the name, in parentheses, and marked with a dagger symbol of the Times New Roman font (†).

== Inflammatory diseases of the central nervous system (320–326) ==
- 320 Bacterial meningitis
  - 320.0 Haemophilus meningitis
  - 320.1 Pneumococcal meningitis
  - 320.2 Streptococcal meningitis
  - 320.3 Staphylococcal meningitis
  - 320.4* Tuberculous meningitis (013.0†)
  - 320.5* Meningococcal meningitis (036.0†)
  - 320.7* Meningitis in other bacterial diseases classified elsewhere
  - 320.8 Meningitis due to other specified bacteria
  - 320.9 Meningitis due to unspecified bacterium
- 321* Meningitis due to other organisms
  - 321.0* Fungal meningitis (110–118†)
  - 321.1* Meningitis due to Coxsackie virus (047.0†)
  - 321.2* Meningitis due to ECHO virus (047.1†)
  - 321.3* Meningitis due to herpes zoster virus (053.0†)
  - 321.4* Meningitis due to herpes simplex virus (054.7†)
  - 321.5* Meningitis due to mumps virus (072.1†)
  - 321.6* Meningitis due to lymphocytic choriomeningitis virus (049.0†)
  - 321.7* Meningitis due to other and unspecified viruses
  - 321.8* Other
- 322 Meningitis of unspecified cause
  - 322.0 Nonpyogenic meningitis
  - 322.1 Eosinophilic meningitis
  - 322.2 Chronic meningitis
  - 322.9 Meningitis, unspecified
- 323 Encephalitis, myelitis and encephalomyelitis
  - 323.0* Kuru (046.0†)
  - 323.1* Subacute sclerosing panencephalitis (046.2†)
  - 323.2* Poliomyelitis (045.–†)
  - 323.3* Arthropod-borne viral encephalitis (062-064†)
  - 323.4* Other encephalitis due to infection
  - 323.5 Encephalitis following immunization procedures
  - 323.6* Postinfectious encephalitis
  - 323.7* Toxic encephalitis
  - 323.8 Other
  - 323.9 Unspecified cause
- 324 Intracranial and intraspinal abscess
  - 324.0 Intracranial abscess
  - 324.1 Intraspinal abscess
  - 324.9 Of unspecified site
- 325 Phlebitis and thrombophlebitis of intracranial venous sinuses
- 326 Late effects of intracranial abscess or pyogenic infection

== Hereditary and Degenerative diseases of the central nervous system (330–337) ==
- 330 Cerebral degenerations usually manifest in childhood
  - 330.0 Leucodystrophy
  - 330.1 Cerebral lipidoses
  - 330.2* Cerebral degeneration in generalized lipidoses (272.7†)
  - 330.3* Cerebral degeneration of childhood in other diseases classified elsewhere
  - 330.8 Other cerebral degenerations in childhood
  - 330.9 Unspecified
- 331 Other cerebral degenerations
  - 331.0 Alzheimer's disease
  - 331.1 Pick's disease
  - 331.2 Senile degeneration of brain
  - 331.3 Communicating hydrocephalus
  - 331.4 Obstructive hydrocephalus
  - 331.5* Jakob-Creutzfeldt disease (046.1†)
  - 331.6* Progressive multifocal leucoencephalopathy (046.3†)
  - 331.7* Cerebral degeneration in other diseases classified elsewhere
  - 331.8 Other cerebral degeneration
  - 331.9 Unspecified
- 332 Parkinson's disease
  - 332.0 Paralysis agitans
  - 332.1 Secondary Parkinsonism
- 333 Other extrapyramidal disease and abnormal movement disorders
  - 333.0 Other degenerative diseases of the basal ganglia
  - 333.1 Essential and other specified forms of tremor
  - 333.2 Myoclonus
  - 333.3 Tics of organic origin
  - 333.4 Huntington's chorea
  - 333.5 Other choreas
  - 333.6 Idiopathic torsion dystonia
  - 333.7 Symptomatic torsion dystonia
  - 333.8 Fragments of torsion dystonia
  - 333.9 Other and unspecified
- 334 Spinocerebellar disease
  - 334.0 Friedreich's ataxia
  - 334.1 Hereditary spastic paraplegia
  - 334.2 Primary cerebellar degeneration
  - 334.3 Other cerebellar ataxia
  - 334.4* Cerebellar ataxia in diseases classified elsewhere
  - 334.8 Other
  - 334.9 Unspecified
- 335 Anterior horn cell disease
  - 335.0 Werdnig-Hoffmann disease
  - 335.1 Spinal muscular atrophy
  - 335.2 Motor neurone disease
  - 335.8 Other
  - 335.9 Unspecified
- 336 Other diseases of spinal cord
  - 336.0 Syringomyelia and syringobulbia
  - 336.1 Vascular myelopathies
  - 336.2* Subacute combined degeneration of spinal cord (266.2, 281.0, 281.1†)
  - 336.3* Myelopathy in other diseases classified elsewhere
  - 336.8 Other myelopathy
  - 336.9 Unspecified diseases of spinal cord
- 337 Disorders of the autonomic nervous system
  - 337.0 Idiopathic peripheral autonomic neuropathy
  - 337.1* Peripheral autonomic neuropathy in disorders classified elsewhere
  - 337.9 Unspecified

== Other disorders of the central nervous system (340–349) ==
- 340 Multiple sclerosis
- 341 Other demyelinating diseases of central nervous system
  - 341.0 Neuromyelitis optica
  - 341.1 Schilder's disease
  - 341.8 Other
  - 341.9 Unspecified
- 342 Hemiplegia
  - 342.0 Flaccid hemiplegia
  - 342.1 Spastic hemiplegia
  - 342.9 Unspecified
- 343 Infantile cerebral palsy
  - 343.0 Diplegic
  - 343.1 Hemiplegic
  - 343.2 Quadriplegic
  - 343.3 Monoplegic
  - 343.4 Infantile hemiplegia
  - 343.8 Other
  - 343.9 Unspecified
- 344 Other paralytic syndromes
  - 344.0 Quadriplegia
  - 344.1 Paraplegia
  - 344.2 Diplegia of upper limbs
  - 344.3 Monoplegia of lower limb
  - 344.4 Monoplegia of upper limb
  - 344.5 Unspecified monoplegia
  - 344.6 Cauda equina syndrome
  - 344.8 Other
  - 344.9 Unspecified
- 345 Epilepsy
  - 345.0 Generalized nonconvulsive epilepsy
  - 345.1 Generalized convulsive epilepsy
  - 345.2 Petit mal status
  - 345.3 Grand mal status
  - 345.4 Partial epilepsy, with impairment of consciousness
  - 345.5 Partial epilepsy, without mention of impairment of consciousness
  - 345.6 Infantile spasms
  - 345.7 Epilepsia partialis continua
  - 345.8 Other
  - 345.9 Unspecified
- 346 Migraine
  - 346.0 Classical migraine
  - 346.1 Common migraine
  - 346.2 Variants of migraine
  - 346.8 Other
  - 346.9 Unspecified
- 347 Cataplexy and narcolepsy
- 348 Other conditions of brain
  - 348.0 Cerebral cysts
  - 348.1 Anoxic brain damage
  - 348.2 Benign intracranial hypertension
  - 348.3 Encephalopathy, unspecified
  - 348.4 Compression of brain
  - 348.5 Cerebral oedema
  - 348.8 Other
  - 348.9 Unspecified
- 349 Other and unspecified disorders of the nervous system
  - 349.0 Reaction to spinal or lumbar puncture
  - 349.1 Nervous system complications from surgically implanted device
  - 349.2 Disorders of meninges, not elsewhere classified
  - 349.8 Other
  - 349.9 Unspecified

== Disorders of the peripheral nervous system (350–359) ==
- 350 Trigeminal nerve disorders
  - 350.0* Post-herpetic trigeminal neuralgia (053.1†)
  - 350.1 Other trigeminal neuralgia
  - 350.2 Atypical face pain
  - 350.8 Other
  - 350.9 Unspecified
- 351 Facial nerve disorders
  - 351.0 Bell's palsy
  - 351.1 Geniculate ganglionitis
  - 351.8 Other
  - 351.9 Unspecified
- 352 Disorders of other cranial nerves
  - 352.0 Disorders of olfactory [1st] nerve
  - 352.1 Glossopharyngeal neuralgia
  - 352.2 Other disorders of glossopharyngeal [9th] nerve
  - 352.3 Disorders of pneumogastric [10th] nerve
  - 352.4 Disorders of accessory [11th] nerve
  - 352.5 Disorders of hypoglossal [12th] nerve
  - 352.6 Multiple cranial nerve palsies
  - 352.9 Unspecified
- 353 Nerve root and plexus disorders
  - 353.0 Brachial plexus lesions
  - 353.1 Lumbosacral plexus lesions
  - 353.2 Cervical root lesions, not elsewhere classified
  - 353.3 Thoracic root lesions, not elsewhere classified
  - 353.4 Lumbosacral root lesions, not elsewhere classified
  - 353.5 Neuralgic amyotrophy
  - 353.6 Phantom limb syndrome
  - 353.8 Other
  - 353.9 Unspecified
- 354 Mononeuritis of upper limb and mononeuritis multiplex
  - 354.0 Carpal tunnel syndrome
  - 354.1 Other lesion of median nerve
  - 354.2 Lesion of ulnar nerve
  - 354.3 Lesion of radial nerve
  - 354.4 Causalgia
  - 354.5 Mononeuritis multiplex
  - 354.8 Other
  - 354.9 Unspecified
- 355 Mononeuritis of lower limb
  - 355.0 Lesion of sciatic nerve
  - 355.1 Meralgia paraesthetica
  - 355.2 Lesion of femoral nerve
  - 355.3 Lesion of lateral popliteal nerve
  - 355.4 Lesion of medial popliteal nerve
  - 355.5 Tarsal tunnel syndrome
  - 355.6 Lesion of plantar nerve
  - 355.7 Other
  - 355.8 Unspecified mononeuritis of lower limb
  - 355.9 Mononeuritis of unspecified site
- 356 Hereditary and idiopathic peripheral neuropathy
  - 356.0 Hereditary peripheral neuropathy
  - 356.1 Peroneal muscular atrophy
  - 356.2 Hereditary sensory neuropathy
  - 356.3 Refsum's disease
  - 356.4 Idiopathic progressive polyneuropathy
  - 356.8 Other
  - 356.9 Unspecified
- 357 Inflammatory and toxic neuropathy
  - 357.0 Acute infective polyneuritis
  - 357.1* Polyneuropathy in collagen vascular disease
  - 357.2* Polyneuropathy in diabetes (250.5†)
  - 357.3* Polyneuropathy in malignant disease (140–208†)
  - 357.4* Polyneuropathy in other diseases classified elsewhere
  - 357.5 Alcoholic polyneuropathy
  - 357.6 Polyneuropathy due to drugs
  - 357.7 Polyneuropathy due to other toxic agents
  - 357.8 Other
  - 357.9 Unspecified
- 358 Myoneural disorders
  - 358.0 Myasthenia gravis
  - 358.1* Myasthenic syndromes in diseases classified elsewhere
  - 358.2 Toxic myoneural disorders
  - 358.8 Other
  - 358.9 Unspecified
- 359 Muscular dystrophies and other myopathies
  - 359.0 Congenital hereditary muscular dystrophy
  - 359.1 Hereditary progressive muscular dystrophy
  - 359.2 Myotonic disorders
  - 359.3 Familial periodic paralysis
  - 359.4 Toxic myopathy
  - 359.5* Endocrine myopathy
  - 359.6* Symptomatic inflammatory myopathy
  - 359.8 Other
  - 359.9 Unspecified

== Disorders of the eye and adnexa (360–379) ==
- 360 Disorders of the globe
  - 360.0 Purulent endophthalmitis
  - 360.1 Other endophthalmitis
  - 360.2 Degenerative disorders of globe
  - 360.3 Hypotony of eye
  - 360.4 Degenerated conditions of globe
  - 360.5 Retained (old) intraocular foreign body, magnetic
  - 360.6 Retained (old) intraocular foreign body, nonmagnetic
  - 360.8 Other disorders of globe
  - 360.9 Unspecified
- 361 Retinal detachments and defects
  - 361.0 Retinal detachment with retinal defect
  - 361.1 Retinoschisis and retinal cysts
  - 361.2 Serous retinal detachment
  - 361.3 Retinal defects without detachment
  - 361.8 Other forms of retinal detachment
  - 361.9 Unspecified
- 362 Other retinal disorders
  - 362.0* Diabetic retinopathy (250.4†)
  - 362.1 Other background retinopathy and retinal vascular changes
  - 362.2 Other proliferative retinopathy
  - 362.3 Retinal vascular occlusion
  - 362.4 Separation of retinal layers
  - 362.5 Degeneration of macula and posterior pole
  - 362.6 Peripheral retinal degenerations
  - 362.7 Hereditary retinal dystrophies
  - 362.8 Other retinal disorders
  - 362.9 Unspecified
- 363 Chorioretinal inflammations and scars and other disorders of choroid
  - 363.0 Focal chorioretinitis and focal retinochoroiditis
  - 363.1 Disseminated chorioretinitis and disseminated retinochoroiditis
  - 363.2 Other and unspecified forms of chorioretinitis and retinochoroiditis
  - 363.3 Chorioretinal scars
  - 363.4 Choroidal degenerations
  - 363.6 Choroidal haemorrhage and rupture
  - 363.7 Choroidal detachment
  - 363.8 Other disorders of choroid
  - 363.9 Unspecified
- 364 Disorders of iris and ciliary body
  - 364.0 Acute and subacute iridocyclitis
  - 364.1 Chronic iridocyclitis
  - 364.2 Certain types of iridocyclitis
  - 364.3 Unspecified iridocyclitis
  - 364.4 Vascular disorders of iris and ciliary body
  - 364.5 Degenerations of iris and ciliary body
  - 364.6 Cysts of iris, ciliary body and anterior chamber
  - 364.7 Adhesions and disruptions of iris and ciliary body
  - 364.8 Other disorders of iris and ciliary body
  - 364.9 Unspecified
- 365 Glaucoma
  - 365.0 Borderline glaucoma
  - 365.1 Open-angle glaucoma
  - 365.2 Primary angle-closure glaucoma
  - 365.3 Corticosteroid-induced glaucoma
  - 365.4 Glaucoma associated with congenital anomalies, with dystrophies and with systemic syndromes
  - 365.5 Glaucoma associated with disorders of the lens
  - 365.6 Glaucoma associated with other ocular disorders
  - 365.8 Other glaucoma
  - 365.9 Unspecified
- 366 Cataract
  - 366.0 Infantile, juvenile and presenile cataract
  - 366.1 Senile cataract
  - 366.2 Traumatic cataract
  - 366.3 Cataract secondary to ocular disorders
  - 366.4 Cataract associated with other disorders
  - 366.5 After-cataract
  - 366.8 Other cataract
  - 366.9 Unspecified
- 367 Disorders of refraction and accommodation
  - 367.0 Hypermetropia
  - 367.1 Myopia
  - 367.2 Astigmatism
  - 367.3 Anisometropia and aniseikonia
  - 367.4 Presbyopia
  - 367.5 Disorders of accommodation
  - 367.8 Other
  - 367.9 Unspecified
- 368 Visual disturbances
  - 368.0 Amblyopia ex anopsia
  - 368.1 Subjective visual disturbances
  - 368.2 Diplopia
  - 368.3 Other disorders of binocular vision
  - 368.4 Visual field defects
  - 368.5 Colour vision deficiencies
  - 368.6 Night blindness
  - 368.8 Other visual disturbances
  - 368.9 Unspecified
- 369 Blindness and low vision
  - 369.0 Blindness, both eyes
  - 369.1 Blindness, one eye, low vision other eye
  - 369.2 Low vision, both eyes
  - 369.3 Unqualified visual loss, both eyes
  - 369.4 Legal blindness, as defined in U.S.A.
  - 369.6 Blindness, one eye
  - 369.7 Low vision, one eye
  - 369.8 Unqualified visual loss, one eye
  - 369.9 Unspecified visual loss
- 370 Keratitis
  - 370.0 Corneal ulcer
  - 370.1* Dendritic keratitis (054.4†)
  - 370.2 Other superficial keratitis without conjunctivitis
  - 370.3 Certain types of keratoconjunctivitis
  - 370.4 Other and unspecified keratoconjunctivitis
  - 370.5 Interstitial and deep keratitis
  - 370.6 Corneal neovascularization
  - 370.8 Other forms of keratitis
  - 370.9 Unspecified
- 371 Corneal opacity and other disorders of cornea
  - 371.0 Corneal scars and opacities
  - 371.1 Corneal pigmentations and deposits
  - 371.2 Corneal oedema
  - 371.3 Changes of corneal membranes
  - 371.4 Corneal degenerations
  - 371.5 Hereditary corneal dystrophies
  - 371.6 Keratoconus
  - 371.7 Other corneal deformities
  - 371.8 Other corneal disorders
  - 371.9 Unspecified
- 372 Disorders of conjunctiva
  - 372.0 Acute conjunctivitis
  - 372.1 Chronic conjunctivitis
  - 372.2 Blepharoconjunctivitis
  - 372.3 Other and unspecified conjunctivitis
  - 372.4 Pterygium
  - 372.5 Conjunctival degenerations and deposits
  - 372.6 Conjunctival scars
  - 372.7 Conjunctival vascular disorders and cysts
  - 372.8 Other disorders of conjunctiva
  - 372.9 Unspecified
- 373 Inflammation of eyelids
  - 373.0 Blepharitis
  - 373.2 Chalazion
  - 373.3 Noninfectious dermatoses of eyelid
  - 373.4* Infective dermatitis of eyelid of types resulting in deformity
  - 373.5* Other infective dermatitis of eyelid
  - 373.6* Parasitic infestation of eyelid
  - 373.8 Other
  - 373.9 Unspecified
- 374 Other disorders of eyelids
  - 374.0 Entropion and trichiasis of eyelid
  - 374.1 Ectropion
  - 374.2 Lagophthalmos
  - 374.3 Ptosis of eyelid
  - 374.4 Other disorders affecting eyelid function
  - 374.5 Degenerative disorders of eyelids and periocular area
  - 374.8 Other disorders of eyelid
  - 374.9 Unspecified
- 375 Disorders of lacrimal system
  - 375.0 Dacryoadenitis
  - 375.1 Other disorders of lacrimal gland
  - 375.2 Epiphora
  - 375.3 Acute and unspecified inflammation of lacrimal passages
  - 375.4 Chronic inflammation of lacrimal passages
  - 375.5 Stenosis and insufficiency of lacrimal passages
  - 375.6 Other changes of lacrimal passages
  - 375.8 Other disorders of lacrimal system
  - 375.9 Unspecified
- 376 Disorders of the orbit
  - 376.0 Acute inflammation of orbit
  - 376.1 Chronic inflammatory disorders of orbit
  - 376.2* Endocrine exophthalmos
  - 376.3 Other exophthalmic conditions
  - 376.4 Deformity of orbit
  - 376.5 Enophthalmos
  - 376.6 Retained (old) foreign body following penetrating wound of orbit
  - 376.8 Other disorders of orbit
  - 376.9 Unspecified
- 377 Disorders of optic nerve and visual pathways
  - 377.0 Papilloedema
  - 377.1 Optic atrophy
  - 377.2 Other disorders of optic disc
  - 377.3 Optic neuritis
  - 377.4 Other disorders of optic nerve
  - 377.5 Disorders of optic chiasm
  - 377.6 Disorders of other visual pathways
  - 377.7 Disorders of visual cortex
  - 377.9 Unspecified
- 378 Strabismus and other disorders of binocular eye movements
  - 378.0 Convergent concomitant strabismus
  - 378.1 Divergent concomitant strabismus
  - 378.2 Intermittent heterotropia
  - 378.3 Other and unspecified heterotropia
  - 378.4 Heterophoria
  - 378.5 Paralytic strabismus
  - 378.6 Mechanical strabismus
  - 378.7 Other strabismus
  - 378.8 Other disorders of binocular eye movements
  - 378.9 Unspecified
- 379 Other disorders of eye
  - 379.0 Scleritis and episcleritis
  - 379.1 Other disorders of sclera
  - 379.2 Disorders of vitreous body
  - 379.3 Aphakia and other disorders of lens
  - 379.4 Anomalies of pupillary function
  - 379.5 Nystagmus and other irregular eye movements
  - 379.8 Other disorders of eye and adnexa
  - 379.9 Unspecified

== Diseases of the ear and mastoid process (380–389) ==
- 380 Disorders of external ear
  - 380.0 Perichondritis of pinna
  - 380.1 Infective otitis externa
  - 380.2 Other otitis externa
  - 380.3 Noninfective disorders of pinna
  - 380.4 Impacted cerumen
  - 380.5 Acquired stenosis of external ear canal
  - 380.8 Other disorders of external ear
  - 380.9 Unspecified
- 381 Nonsuppurative otitis media and Eustachian tube disorders
  - 381.0 Acute nonsuppurative otitis media
  - 381.1 Chronic serous otitis media
  - 381.2 Chronic mucoid otitis media
  - 381.3 Other and unspecified chronic nonsuppurative otitis media
  - 381.4 Nonsuppurative otitis media, not specified as acute or chronic
  - 381.5 Eustachian salpingitis
  - 381.6 Obstruction of Eustachian tube
  - 381.7 Patulous Eustachian tube
  - 381.8 Other disorders of Eustachian tube
  - 381.9 Unspecified Eustachian tube disorder
- 382 Suppurative and unspecified otitis media
  - 382.0 Acute suppurative otitis media
  - 382.1 Chronic tubotympanic suppurative otitis media
  - 382.2 Chronic atticoantral suppurative otitis media
  - 382.3 Unspecified chronic suppurative otitis media
  - 382.4 Unspecified suppurative otitis media
  - 382.9 Unspecified otitis media
- 383 Mastoiditis and related conditions
  - 383.0 Acute mastoiditis
  - 383.1 Chronic mastoiditis
  - 383.2 Petrositis
  - 383.3 Complications following mastoidectomy
  - 383.8 Other
  - 383.9 Unspecified mastoiditis
- 384 Other disorders of tympanic membrane
  - 384.0 Acute myringitis without mention of otitis media
  - 384.1 Chronic myringitis without mention of otitis media
  - 384.2 Perforation of tympanic membrane
  - 384.8 Other
  - 384.9 Unspecified
- 385 Other disorders of middle ear and mastoid
  - 385.0 Tympanosclerosis
  - 385.1 Adhesive middle ear disease
  - 385.2 Other acquired abnormality of ear ossicles
  - 385.3 Cholesteatoma of middle ear and mastoid
  - 385.8 Other
  - 385.9 Unspecified
- 386 Vertiginolls syndromes and other disorders of vestibular system
  - 386.0 Ménière's disease
  - 386.1 Other and unspecified peripheral vertigo
  - 386.2 Vertigo of central origin
  - 386.3 Labyrinthitis
  - 386.4 Labyrinthine fistula
  - 386.5 Labyrinthine dysfunction
  - 386.8 Other disorders of labyrinth
  - 386.9 Unspecified vertiginous syndromes and labyrinthine disorders
- 387 Otosclerosis
  - 387.0 Otosclerosis involving oval window, nonobliterative
  - 387.1 Otosclerosis involving oval window, obliterative
  - 387.2 Cochlear otosclerosis
  - 387.8 Other
  - 387.9 Unspecified
- 388 Other disorders of ear
  - 388.0 Degenerative and vascular disorders of ear
  - 388.1 Noise effects on inner ear
  - 388.2 Sudden hearing loss, unspecified
  - 388.3 Tinnitus
  - 388.4 Other abnormal auditory perception
  - 388.5 Disorders of acoustic nerve
  - 388.6 Otorrhoea
  - 388.7 Otalgia
  - 388.8 Other
  - 388.9 Unspecified
- 389 Deafness
  - 389.0 Conductive deafness
  - 389.1 Sensorineural deafness
  - 389.2 Mixed conductive and sensorineural deafness
  - 389.7 Deaf mutism, not elsewhere classifiable
  - 389.8 Other specified forms of deafness
  - 389.9 Unspecified deafness
