= List of ICD-9 codes 240–279: endocrine, nutritional and metabolic diseases, and immunity disorders =

ICD-9 chapters
Chapter	Block	Title
I	001–139	Infectious and Parasitic Diseases
II	140–239	Neoplasms
III	240–279	Endocrine, Nutritional and Metabolic Diseases, and Immunity Disorders
IV	280–289	Diseases of the Blood and Blood-forming Organs
V	290–319	Mental Disorders
VI	320–389	Diseases of the Nervous System and Sense Organs
VII	390–459	Diseases of the Circulatory System
VIII	460–519	Diseases of the Respiratory System
IX	520–579	Diseases of the Digestive System
X	580–629	Diseases of the Genitourinary System
XI	630–679	Complications of Pregnancy, Childbirth, and the Puerperium
XII	680–709	Diseases of the Skin and Subcutaneous Tissue
XIII	710–739	Diseases of the Musculoskeletal System and Connective Tissue
XIV	740–759	Congenital Anomalies
XV	760–779	Certain Conditions originating in the Perinatal Period
XVI	780–799	Symptoms, Signs and Ill-defined Conditions
XVII	800–999	Injury and Poisoning
	E800–E999	Supplementary Classification of External Causes of Injury and Poisoning
	V01–V82	Supplementary Classification of Factors influencing Health Status and Contact with Health Services
	M8000–M9970	Morphology of Neoplasms

This is a shortened version of the third chapter of the ICD-9: Endocrine, Nutritional and Metabolic Diseases, and Immunity Disorders. It covers ICD codes 240 to 279. The full chapter can be found on pages 145 to 165 of Volume 1, which contains all (sub)categories of the ICD-9. Volume 2 is an alphabetical index of Volume 1. Both volumes can be downloaded for free from the website of the World Health Organization.

== Disorders of thyroid gland (240–246) ==
- 240 Simple and unspecified goiter
  - 240.9 Goiter, unspec.
- 241 Nontoxic nodular goiter
  - 241.0 Thyroid nodule
  - 241.9 Goiter, unspec. nontoxic nodular
- 242 Thyrotoxicosis with or without goiter
  - 242.0 Goiter toxic, diffuse
  - 242.9 Hyperthyroidism, NOS
- 243 Congenital hypothyroidism
- 244 Acquired hypothyroidism
  - 244.0 Hypothyroidism, post-surgical
  - 244.1 Hypothyroidism, post-ablative
  - 244.9 Hypothyroidism, unspec.
- 245 Thyroiditis
  - 245.0 Thyroiditis, acute
  - 245.1 Thyroiditis, subacute
  - 245.2 Thyroiditis, chronic, Hashimoto's
- 246 Other disorders of thyroid
  - 246.2 Thyroid cyst

== Diseases of other endocrine glands (249–259) ==
- Note: for 249–259, the following fifth digit can be added:
  - (250.x0) Diabetes mellitus type 2
  - (250.x1) Diabetes mellitus type 1
  - (250.x2) Diabetes mellitus type 2, uncontrolled
  - (250.x3) Diabetes mellitus type 1, uncontrolled
- 249 Secondary diabetes mellitus
  - 249.0 Secondary diabetes mellitus without mention of complication
  - 249.1 Secondary diabetes mellitus with ketoacidosis
  - 249.2 Secondary diabetes mellitus with hyperosmolarity
  - 249.3 Secondary diabetes mellitus with other coma
  - 249.4 Secondary diabetes mellitus with renal manifestations
  - 249.5 Secondary diabetes mellitus with ophthalmic manifestations
  - 249.6 Secondary diabetes mellitus with neurological manifestations
  - 249.7 Secondary diabetes mellitus with peripheral circulatory disorders
  - 249.8 Secondary diabetes mellitus with other specified manifestations
  - 249.9 Secondary diabetes mellitus with unspecified complications
- 250 Diabetes mellitus
  - 250.0 Diabetes mellitus without mention of complication
  - 250.1 Diabetes with ketoacidosis
  - 250.2 Diabetes with hyperosmolarity
  - 250.3 Diabetes with other coma
  - 250.4 Diabetes with renal manifestations
  - 250.5 Diabetes with ophthalmic manifestations
  - 250.6 Diabetes with neurological manifestations
  - 250.7 Diabetes with peripheral circulatory disorders
  - 250.8 Diabetes with other specified manifestations
  - 250.9 Diabetes with unspecified complication
- 251 Other disorders of pancreatic internal secretion
  - 251.2 Hypoglycemia, nondiabetic, unspec.
- 252 Disorders of parathyroid gland
  - 252.0 Hyperparathyroidism, unspec.
    - 252.01 Hyperparathyroidism, primary
  - 252.1 Hypoparathyroidism
- 253 Disorders of the pituitary gland and its hypothalamic control
  - 253.3 Growth hormone deficiency
  - 253.6 SIADH
- 254 Diseases of thymus gland
- 255 Disorders of adrenal glands
  - 255.0 Cushing's syndrome
- 256 Ovarian dysfunction
  - 256.2 Ovarian failure, postablative
    - 256.39 Ovarian failure, other
  - 256.4 Ovaries, polycystic
- 257 Testicular dysfunction
  - 257.2 Testicular hypofunction
- 258 Polyglandular dysfunction and related disorders
- 259 Other endocrine disorders
  - 259.0 Puberty, delayed
  - 259.1 Sexual precocity

== Nutritional deficiencies (260–269) ==
- 260 Kwashiorkor
- 261 Nutritional marasmus
- 262 Other severe protein–calorie malnutrition
- 263 Other and unspecified protein–calorie malnutrition
- 264 Vitamin A deficiency
  - 264.0 With conjunctival xerosis
  - 264.1 With conjunctival xerosis and Bitot's spot
  - 264.2 With corneal xerosis
  - 264.3 With corneal ulceration and xerosis
  - 264.4 With keratomalacia
  - 264.5 With night blindness
  - 264.6 With xerophthalmic scars of cornea
  - 264.7 Other ocular manifestations of vitamin A deficiency
  - 264.8 Other manifestations of vitamin A deficiency
  - 264.9 Unspecified vitamin A deficiency
- 265 Thiamine and niacin deficiency states
  - 265.0 Beriberi
  - 265.1 Other and unspecified manifestations of thiamine deficiency
    - Wernicke's encephalopathy
  - 265.2 Pellagra
- 266 Deficiency of B-complex components
  - 266.0 Ariboflavinosis
  - 266.2 B12 deficiency w/o anemia
- 267 Ascorbic acid deficiency
- 268 Vitamin D deficiency
- 269 Other nutritional deficiencies
  - 269.0 Deficiency of vitamin K
  - 269.1 Deficiency of other vitamins
  - 269.2 Unspecified vitamin deficiency
  - 269.3 Mineral deficiency, not elsewhere classified

== Other metabolic and immunity disorders (270–279) ==
=== Disorders of amino-acid transport and metabolism ===
- 270 Disorders of amino-acid transport and metabolism
  - 270.0 Disturbances of amino-acid transport
    - Cystinosis
    - Cystinuria
    - Hartnup disease
  - 270.1 Phenylketonuria (PKU)
  - 270.1 Tetrahydrobiopterin deficiency
  - 270.2 Other disturbances of aromatic amino-acid metabolism
    - Albinism
    - Alkaptonuria
    - Hypertyrosinemia
    - Ochronosis
    - Waardenburg syndrome
  - 270.3 Disturbances of branched-chain amino-acid metabolism
    - Isobutyryl-coenzyme A dehydrogenase deficiency
    - Isovaleric acidemia
    - Maple syrup urine disease
    - Methylmalonic acidemia
    - Propionic acidemia
  - 270.4 Disturbances of sulphur-bearing amino-acid metabolism
    - Homocystinuria
  - 270.5 Disorders of histidine metabolism
    - Carnosinemia
    - Histidinemia
    - Hyperhistidinemia
    - Imidazole aminoaciduria
    - Urocanic aciduria
  - 270.6 Disorders of urea cycle metabolism
    - Citrullinemia
    - Hyperammonemia
  - 270.7 Disorders of straight-chain amino-acid metabolism
    - Hyperlysinemia
    - Pipecolic acidemia
    - Saccharopinuria
  - 270.8 Other specified disorders of amino-acid metabolism
    - Trimethylaminuria

=== Disorders of carbohydrate transport and metabolism ===
- 271 Disorders of carbohydrate transport and metabolism
  - 271.0 Glycogenosis
    - Von Gierke's disease
    - McArdle's disease
    - Pompe's disease
  - 271.1 Galactosemia
  - 271.2 Hereditary fructose intolerance
  - 271.3 Intestinal disaccharidase deficiencies and disaccharide malabsorption
    - Lactose intolerance
    - Glucose intolerance
  - 271.4 Renal glycosuria
  - 271.8 Other specified disorders of carbohydrate transport and metabolism
  - 271.9 Unspecified disorder of carbohydrate transport and metabolism

=== Disorders of lipoid metabolism ===
- 272 Disorders of lipoid metabolism
  - 272.0 Pure hypercholesterolemia
    - Fredrickson Type IIa hyperlipoproteinemia
    - Familial hypercholesterolemia
  - 272.1 Pure hyperglyceridemia
    - Hypertriglyceridemia, essential
    - Fredrickson Type IV hyperlipoproteinemia
  - 272.2 Hyperlipidemia, mixed
    - Fredrickson Type IIb or III hyperlipoproteinemia
    - Tubo-eruptive xanthoma
    - Xanthoma tuberosum
  - 272.3 Hyperchylomicronemia
    - Bürger-Grütz syndrome
    - Fredrickson type I or V hyperlipoproteinemia
    - Hyperlipidemia, Group D
    - Mixed hyperglyceridemia
  - 272.4 Other and unspecified hyperlipidemia
    - Alpha-lipoproteinemia
    - Combined hyperlipidemia
  - 272.5 Lipoprotein deficiencies
    - Abetalipoproteinemia
    - Bassen-Kornzweig syndrome
    - High-density lipoid deficiency
    - Hypoalphalipoproteinemia
    - Hypobetalipoproteinemia (familial)
  - 272.6 Lipodystrophy
  - 272.7 Lipidoses
    - Gaucher's disease
    - Niemann-Pick disease
    - Sea-blue histiocyte syndrome
  - 272.8 Other disorders of lipoid metabolism

=== Disorders of plasma protein metabolism ===
- 273 Disorders of plasma protein metabolism
  - 273.0 Polyclonal hypergammaglobulinemia
  - 273.1 Monoclonal paraproteinemia
  - 273.2 Other paraproteinemias
  - 273.3 Macroglobulinemia
    - Waldenström macroglobulinemia
  - 273.8 Other disorders of plasma protein metabolism
    - Atransferrinemia

=== Gout ===
- 274 Gout
  - 274.0 Gouty arthropathy

=== Disorders of mineral metabolism ===
- 275 Disorders of mineral metabolism
  - 275.0 Disorders of iron metabolism
    - Aceruloplasminemia
    - Hemochromatosis
  - 275.1 Disorders of copper metabolism
    - Wilson's disease
  - 275.2 Disorders of magnesium metabolism
    - Hypermagnesemia
    - Hypomagnesemia
  - 275.3 Disorders of phosphorus metabolism
    - Familial hypophosphatemia
    - Hypophosphatasia
  - 275.4 Disorders of calcium metabolism
    - 275.41 Hypocalcemia
    - 275.42 Hypercalcemia
    - 275.49 Pseudohypoparathyroidism

=== Disorders of fluid, electrolyte, and acid-base balance ===
- 276 Disorders of fluid, electrolyte, and acid-base balance
  - 276.0 Hypernatremia
  - 276.1 Hyponatremia
  - 276.2 Acidosis
  - 276.3 Alkalosis
  - 276.4 Mixed acid-base balance disorder
  - 276.5 Dehydration
    - 276.52 Hypovolemia
  - 276.7 Hyperkalemia
  - 276.8 Hypokalemia

=== Other and unspecified disorders of metabolism ===
- 277 Other and unspecified disorders of metabolism
  - 277.0 Cystic fibrosis
  - 277.1 Disorders of porphyrin metabolism
    - Porphyria
      - Acute intermittent porphyria
  - 277.2 Other disorders of purine and pyrimidine metabolism
    - Lesch–Nyhan syndrome
    - Purine nucleoside phosphorylase deficiency
    - Xanthinuria
  - 277.3 Amyloidosis
    - Familial Mediterranean fever
  - 277.4 Hyperbilirubinemia
    - Crigler–Najjar syndrome
    - Gilbert's syndrome
  - 277.5 Mucopolysaccharidosis
    - Hunter syndrome
    - Hurler syndrome
    - Morquio–Brailsford disease
    - Sanfilippo syndrome
  - 277.6 Other deficiencies of circulating enzymes
    - Alpha 1-antitrypsin deficiency
    - Biotinidase deficiency
    - Hereditary angioedema
  - 277.7 Dysmetabolic syndrome X
    - Metabolic syndrome
  - 277.8 Other specified disorders of metabolism
    - 277.81 Primary carnitine deficiency
    - 277.82 Carnitine deficiency due to inborn errors of metabolism
    - 277.83 Iatrogenic carnitine deficiency
    - 277.84 Other secondary carnitine deficiency
    - 277.85 Disorders of fatty acid oxidation metabolism
      - Carnitine palmitoyltransferase I deficiency
      - Carnitine palmitoyltransferase II deficiency
      - Very long-chain acyl-coenzyme A dehydrogenase deficiency
      - Long-chain 3-hydroxyacyl-coenzyme A dehydrogenase deficiency
      - Medium-chain acyl-coenzyme A dehydrogenase deficiency
    - 277.86 Disorders of peroxisomal metabolism
      - Zellweger syndrome
    - 277.87 Disorders of mitochondrial metabolism
      - Kearns–Sayre syndrome
      - Mitochondrial encephalopathy, lactic acidosis and stroke-like episodes (MELAS syndrome)
      - Mitochondrial neurogastrointestinal encephalopathy syndrome (MNGIE)
      - Myoclonus with epilepsy and with ragged red fibers (MERRF syndrome)
      - Neuropathy, ataxia, and retinitis pigmentosa (NARP syndrome)
    - 277.88 Tumor lysis syndrome
    - 277.89 Other specified disorders of metabolism

=== Obesity and other hyperalimentation ===
- 278 Obesity and other hyperalimentation
  - 278.0 Obesity, NOS
  - 278.1 Localized adiposity
  - 278.2 Hypervitaminosis A
  - 278.3 Hypercarotenemia
  - 278.4 Hypervitaminosis D

=== Disorders involving the immune mechanism ===
- 279 Disorders involving the immune mechanism
  - 279.0 Deficiency of humoral immunity
    - 279.00 Hypogammaglobulinemia unspecified
    - 279.01 Selective IgA immunodeficiency
    - 279.02 Selective IgM immunodeficiency
    - 279.03 Other selective immunoglobulin deficiencies
    - 279.04 Congenital hypogammaglobulinemia
    - 279.05 Immunodeficiency with increased IgM
    - 279.06 Common variable immunodeficiency
    - 279.09 Other deficiency of humoral immunity
  - 279.1 Deficiency of cell-mediated immunity
    - 279.10 Immunodeficiency with predominant t-cell defect unspecified
    - 279.11 DiGeorge syndrome
    - 279.12 Wiskott–Aldrich syndrome
    - 279.13 Nezelof syndrome
    - 279.19 Other deficiency of cell-mediated immunity
  - 279.2 Combined immunity deficiency
    - Severe combined immunodeficiency
  - 279.3 Unspecified immunity deficiency
  - 279.4 Autoimmune disease not elsewhere classified
  - 279.5 Graft-versus-host disease
  - 279.8 Other specified disorders involving the immune mechanism
  - 279.9 Unspecified disorder of immune mechanism
