= List of ICD-9 codes E and V codes: external causes of injury and supplemental classification =

ICD-9 chapters
Chapter	Block	Title
I	001–139	Infectious and Parasitic Diseases
II	140–239	Neoplasms
III	240–279	Endocrine, Nutritional and Metabolic Diseases, and Immunity Disorders
IV	280–289	Diseases of the Blood and Blood-forming Organs
V	290–319	Mental Disorders
VI	320–389	Diseases of the Nervous System and Sense Organs
VII	390–459	Diseases of the Circulatory System
VIII	460–519	Diseases of the Respiratory System
IX	520–579	Diseases of the Digestive System
X	580–629	Diseases of the Genitourinary System
XI	630–679	Complications of Pregnancy, Childbirth, and the Puerperium
XII	680–709	Diseases of the Skin and Subcutaneous Tissue
XIII	710–739	Diseases of the Musculoskeletal System and Connective Tissue
XIV	740–759	Congenital Anomalies
XV	760–779	Certain Conditions originating in the Perinatal Period
XVI	780–799	Symptoms, Signs and Ill-defined Conditions
XVII	800–999	Injury and Poisoning
	E800–E999	Supplementary Classification of External Causes of Injury and Poisoning
	V01–V82	Supplementary Classification of Factors influencing Health Status and Contact with Health Services
	M8000–M9970	Morphology of Neoplasms

== (E000) External cause status ==
- E000 External cause status
  - E000.0 Civilian activity done for income or pay
  - E000.1 Military activity
  - E000.2 Volunteer activity
  - E000.8 Other external cause status
  - E000.9 Unspecified external cause status

== (E001–E030) Activity ==
- E001 Activities involving walking and running
- E002 Activities involving water and water craft
- E003 Activities involving snow and ice
- E004 Activities involving climbing, rappelling and jumping off
- E005 Activities involving dancing and other rhythmic movement
- E006 Activities involving other sports and athletics played individually
- E007 Activities involving other sports and athletics played as a team or group
- E008 Activities involving other specified sports and athletics
- E009 Activity involving other cardiorespiratory exercise
- E010 Activity involving other muscle strengthening exercises
- E011 Activities involving computer technology and electronic devices
- E012 Activities involving arts and handcrafts
- E013 Activities involving personal hygiene and household maintenance
- E014 Activities involving person providing caregiving
- E015 Activities involving food preparation, cooking and grilling
- E016 Activities involving property and land maintenance, building and construction
- E017 Activities involving roller coasters and other types of external motion
- E018 Activities involving playing musical instrument
- E019 Activities involving animal care
- E029 Other activity
- E030 Unspecified activity

== (E800–E807) Railway accidents ==
- E800 Railway accident involving collision with rolling stock
- E801 Railway accident involving collision with other object

Excludes: Collision with: aircraft (E840-E842) or motor vehicle (E810.-, E820-E822)

- E802 Railway accident involving derailment without antecedent collision
- E803 Railway accident involving explosion, fire, or burning

Excludes: Explosion or fire, with mention of antecedent collision (E800.-, E801.-), explosion or fire, with antecedent derailment (E802.-)

- E804 Fall in, on, or from railway train

Excludes: Fall related to collision, derailment, or explosion of railway train (E800-E803)

- E805 Hit by rolling stock

Includes: Knocked down, run over, crushed; injured of killed by railway train or part of it
Excludes: Pedestrian hit by object set in motion by railway train (E806.-)

- E806 Other specified railway accident

Includes: Hit by object falling in railway train; injured by door or window on railway train; non-motor road vehicle or pedestrian hit by object set in motion by railway train; or railway train hit by falling object (earth, rock tree etc.)
Excludes: Railway accident due to cataclysm (E908-E909)

- E807 Railway accident of unspecified nature

== (E810–E819) Motor vehicle traffic accidents ==
- E810 Motor vehicle traffic accident involving collision with train
- E811 Motor vehicle traffic accident involving re-entrant collision with another motor vehicle
- E812 Other motor vehicle traffic accident involving collision with motor vehicle
- E813 Motor vehicle traffic accident involving collision with other vehicle
- E814 Motor vehicle traffic accident involving collision with pedestrian
- E815 Other motor vehicle traffic accident involving collision on the highway
- E816 Motor vehicle traffic accident due to loss of control without collision on the highway
- E817 Noncollision motor vehicle traffic accident while boarding or alighting
- E818 Other noncollision motor vehicle traffic accident
- E819 Motor vehicle traffic accident of unspecified nature

== (E820–E825) Motor vehicle non-traffic accidents ==
- E820 Nontraffic accident involving motor-driven snow vehicle
- E821 Nontraffic accident involving other off-road motor vehicle
- E822 Other motor vehicle nontraffic accident involving collision with moving object
- E823 Other motor vehicle nontraffic accident involving collision with stationary object
- E824 Other motor vehicle nontraffic accident while boarding and alighting
- E825 Other motor vehicle nontraffic accident of other and unspecified nature

== (E826–E829) Other road vehicle accidents ==
- E826 Pedal cycle accident
  - E826.0 Pedal cycle accident injuring pedestrian
  - E826.1 Pedal cycle accident injuring pedal cyclist
  - E826.2 Pedal cycle accident injuring rider of animal
  - E826.3 Pedal cycle accident injuring occupant of animal-drawn vehicle
  - E826.4 Pedal cycle accident injuring occupant of streetcar
  - E826.8 Pedal cycle accident injuring other specified person
  - E826.9 Pedal cycle accident injuring unspecified person
- E827 Animal-drawn vehicle accident
  - E827.0 Animal-drawn vehicle accident injuring pedestrian
  - E827.2 Animal-drawn vehicle accident injuring rider of animal
  - E827.3 Animal-drawn vehicle accident injuring occupant of animal drawn vehicle
  - E827.4 Animal-drawn vehicle accident injuring occupant of streetcar
  - E827.8 Animal-drawn vehicle accident injuring other specified person
  - E827.9 Animal-drawn vehicle accident injuring unspecified person
- E828 Accident involving animal being ridden
  - E828.0 Accident involving animal being ridden injuring pedestrian
  - E828.2 Accident involving animal being ridden injuring rider of animal
  - E828.4 Accident involving animal being ridden injuring occupant of streetcar
  - E828.8 Accident involving animal being ridden injuring other specified person
  - E828.9 Accident involving animal being ridden injuring unspecified person
- E829 Other road vehicle accidents
  - E829.0 Other road vehicle accidents injuring pedestrian
  - E829.4 Other road vehicle accidents injuring occupant of streetcar
  - E829.8 Other road vehicle accidents injuring other specified person
  - E829.9 Other road vehicle accidents injuring unspecified person

== (E830–E838) Water transport accidents ==
- E830 Accident to watercraft causing submersion
  - E830.0 Accident to watercraft causing submersion injuring occupant of small boat, unpowered
  - E830.1 Accident to watercraft causing submersion injuring occupant of small boat, powered
  - E830.2 Accident to watercraft causing submersion injuring occupant of other watercraft—crew
  - E830.3 Accident to watercraft causing submersion injuring occupant of other watercraft—other than crew
  - E830.4 Accident to watercraft causing submersion injuring water skier
  - E830.5 Accident to watercraft causing submersion injuring swimmer
  - E830.6 Accident to watercraft causing submersion injuring dockers, stevedores
  - E830.7 Accident to watercraft causing submersion, occupant of military watercraft, any type
  - E830.8 Accident to watercraft causing submersion injuring other specified person
  - E830.9 Accident to watercraft causing submersion injuring unspecified person
- E831 Accident to watercraft causing other injury
  - E831.0 Accident to watercraft causing other injury to occupant of small boat, unpowered
  - E831.1 Accident to watercraft causing other injury to occupant of small boat, powered
  - E831.2 Accident to watercraft causing other injury to occupant of other watercraft—crew
  - E831.3 Accident to watercraft causing other injury to occupant of other watercraft—other than crew
  - E831.4 Accident to watercraft causing other injury to water skier
  - E831.5 Accident to watercraft causing other injury to swimmer
  - E831.6 Accident to watercraft causing other injury to dockers, stevedores
  - E831.7 Accident to watercraft causing other injury, occupant of military watercraft, any type
  - E831.8 Accident to watercraft causing other injury to other specified person
  - E831.9 Accident to watercraft causing other injury to unspecified person
- E832 Other accidental submersion or drowning in water transport accident
- E833 Fall on stairs or ladders in water transport
- E834 Other fall from one level to another in water transport
- E835 Other and unspecified fall in water transport
- E836 Machinery accident in water transport
- E837 Explosion fire or burning in watercraft
- E838 Other and unspecified water transport accident

== (E840–E845) Air and space transport accidents ==
- E840 Accident to powered aircraft at takeoff or landing
- E840.0 Accident to powered aircraft at takeoff or landing, injuring occupant of aircraft
- E840.1 Accident to powered aircraft at takeoff or landing, injuring any occupant of military aircraft
- E840.2 Accident to powered aircraft at takeoff or landing, injuring crew of commercial aircraft (powered) in surface to surface transport
- E840.3 Accident to powered aircraft at takeoff or landing, injuring other occupant of commercial aircraft (powered) in surface to surface transport
- E845.0 Accident to spacecraft, injuring occupant of spacecraft

Note excludes effects of weightlessness in spacecraft (see E928.0)

- E845.8 Accident to spacecraft, injuring groundcrew
- E845.9 Accident to spacecraft, injuring other person

== (E846–E848) Vehicle accidents not elsewhere classifiable ==
- E846 Accidents involving powered vehicles used solely within the buildings and premises of industrial or commercial establishments
- E847 Accidents involving cable cars not running on rails
- E848 Accidents involving other vehicles, not elsewhere classifiable

== (E849) Place of Occurrence ==
- E849.0 Place of occurrence at Home
- E849.1 Place of occurrence at Farm
- E849.2 Place of occurrence at Mine and/or Quarry
- E849.3 Place of occurrence at Industrial Premises
- E849.4 Place of occurrence at Recreation/Sport
- E849.5 Place of occurrence at Street and Highway
- E849.6 Place of occurrence at Public building
- E849.7 Place of occurrence at Residential institution
- E849.8 Place of occurrence at Other specified places
- E849.9 Place of occurrence at Unspecified place
- E849.0 Place of occurrence at home

== (E850–E858) Accidental poisoning by drugs, medicinal substances, and biologicals ==
- E850 Accidental poisoning by analgesics antipyretics and antirheumatics
- E851 Accidental poisoning by barbiturates
- E852 Accidental poisoning by other sedatives and hypnotics
- E853 Accidental poisoning by tranquilizers
- E854 Accidental poisoning by other psychotropic agents
- E855 Accidental poisoning by other drugs acting on central and autonomic nervous system
- E856 Accidental poisoning by antibiotics
- E857 Accidental poisoning by other anti-infectives
- E858 Accidental poisoning by other drugs

== (E870–E876) Misadventures to patients during surgical and medical care ==
- E870 Accidental cut puncture perforation or hemorrhage during medical care
  - E870.0 Accidental cut, puncture, perforation or hemorrhage during surgical operation
  - E870.1 Accidental cut, puncture, perforation or hemorrhage during infusion or transfusion
  - E870.2 Accidental cut, puncture, perforation or hemorrhage during kidney dialysis or other perfusion
  - E870.3 Accidental cut, puncture, perforation or hemorrhage during injection or vaccination
  - E870.4 Accidental cut, puncture, perforation or hemorrhage during endoscopic examination
  - E870.5 Accidental cut, puncture, perforation or hemorrhage during aspiration of fluid or tissue, puncture, and catheterization
  - E870.6 Accidental cut, puncture, perforation or hemorrhage during heart catheterization
  - E870.7 Accidental cut, puncture, perforation or hemorrhage during administration of enema
  - E870.8 Accidental cut, puncture, perforation or hemorrhage during other specified medical care
  - E870.9 Accidental cut, puncture, perforation or hemorrhage during unspecified medical care
- E871 Foreign object left in body during procedure
  - E871.0 Foreign object left in body during surgical operation
  - E871.1 Foreign object left in body during infusion or transfusion
  - E871.2 Foreign object left in body during kidney dialysis or other perfusion
  - E871.3 Foreign object left in body during injection or vaccination
  - E871.4 Foreign object left in body during endoscopic examination
  - E871.5 Foreign object left in body during aspiration of fluid or tissue, puncture, and catheterization
  - E871.6 Foreign object left in body during heart catheterization
  - E871.7 Foreign object left in body during removal of catheter or packing
  - E871.8 Foreign object left in body during other specified procedures
  - E871.9 Foreign object left in body during unspecified procedure
- E872 Failure of sterile precautions during procedure
  - E872.0 Failure of sterile precautions during surgical operation
  - E872.1 Failure of sterile precautions during infusion or transfusion
  - E872.2 Failure of sterile precautions during kidney dialysis and other perfusion
  - E872.3 Failure of sterile precautions during injection or vaccination
  - E872.4 Failure of sterile precautions during endoscopic examination
  - E872.5 Failure of sterile precautions during aspiration of fluid or tissue, puncture, and catheterization
  - E872.6 Failure of sterile precautions during heart catheterization
  - E872.8 Failure of sterile precautions during other specified procedures
  - E872.9 Failure of sterile precautions during unspecified procedure
- E873 Failure in dosage
  - E873.0 Excessive amount of blood or other fluid during transfusion or infusion
  - E873.1 Incorrect dilution of fluid during infusion
  - E873.2 Overdose of radiation in therapy
  - E873.3 Inadvertent exposure of patient to radiation during medical care
  - E873.4 Failure in dosage in electroshock or insulin-shock therapy
  - E873.5 Inappropriate [too hot or too cold] temperature in local application and packing
  - E873.6 Nonadministration of necessary drug or medicinal substance
  - E873.8 Other specified failure in dosage
  - E873.9 Unspecified failure in dosage
- E874 Mechanical failure of instrument or apparatus during procedure
  - E874.0 Mechanical failure of instrument or apparatus during surgical operation
  - E874.1 Mechanical failure of instrument or apparatus during infusion and transfusion
  - E874.2 Mechanical failure of instrument or apparatus during kidney dialysis and other perfusion
  - E874.3 Mechanical failure of instrument or apparatus during endoscopic examination
  - E874.4 Mechanical failure of instrument or apparatus during aspiration of fluid or tissue, puncture, and catheterization
  - E874.5 Mechanical failure of instrument or apparatus during heart catheterization
  - E874.8 Mechanical failure of instrument or apparatus during other specified procedures
  - E874.9 Mechanical failure of instrument or apparatus during unspecified procedure
- E875 Contaminated or infected blood other fluid drug or biological substance
  - E875.0 Contaminated substance transfused or infused
  - E875.1 Contaminated substance injected or used for vaccination
  - E875.2 Contaminated drug or biological substance administered by other means
  - E875.8 Misadventure to patient from other contamination
  - E875.9 Misadventure to patient from unspecified contamination
- E876 Other and unspecified misadventures during medical care
  - E876.0 Mismatched blood in transfusion
  - E876.1 Wrong fluid in infusion
  - E876.2 Failure in suture and ligature during surgical operation
  - E876.3 Endotracheal tube wrongly placed during anesthetic procedure
  - E876.4 Failure to introduce or to remove other tube or instrument
  - E876.5 Performance of wrong operation (procedure) on correct patient
  - E876.6 Performance of operation (procedure) on patient not scheduled for surgery
  - E876.7 Performance of correct operation (procedure) on wrong side/body part
  - E876.8 Other specified misadventures during medical care
  - E876.9 Unspecified misadventure during medical care

== (E880–E888) Accidental falls ==
- E885.9 Fall on same level from slipping, tripping or stumbling

== (E900–E909) Accidents due to natural and environmental factors ==
- E905 Venomous animals and plants as the cause of poisoning and toxic reactions
- E905.0 Venomous snakes and lizards causing poisoning and toxic reactions
- E905.1 Venomous spiders causing poisoning and toxic reactions
- E905.2 Scorpion sting causing poisoning and toxic reactions
- E905.3 Sting of hornets wasps and bees causing poisoning and toxic reactions
- E905.4 Centipede and venomous millipede (tropical) bite causing poisoning and toxic reactions
- E905.5 Other venomous arthropods causing poisoning and toxic reactions
- E905.6 Venomous marine animals and plants causing poisoning and toxic reactions
- E905.7 Poisoning and toxic reactions caused by other plants
- E905.8 Poisoning and toxic reactions caused by other specified animals and plants
- E905.9 Poisoning and toxic reactions caused by unspecified animals and plants
- E906 Other injury caused by animals
- E906.0 Dog bite
- E906.1 Rat bite
- E906.2 Bite of nonvenomous snakes and lizards
- E906.3 Bite of other animal except arthropod
- E906.4 Bite of nonvenomous arthropod
- E906.5 Bite by unspecified animal
- E906.8 Other specified injury caused by animal
- E906.9 Unspecified injury caused by animal

== (E910–E915) Accidents caused by submersion, suffocation, and foreign bodies ==
- E910 Accidental drowning and submersion
- E911 Inhalation and ingestion of food causing obstruction of respiratory tract or suffocation
- E912 Inhalation and ingestion of other object causing obstruction of respiratory tract or suffocation
- E913 Accidental mechanical suffocation
- E914 Foreign body accidentally entering eye and adnexa
- E915 Foreign body accidentally entering other orifice

== (E916–E928) Other accidents ==
- E916 Struck accidentally by falling object
- E917 Striking against or struck accidentally by objects or persons
- E918 Caught accidentally in or between objects
- E919 Accidents caused by machinery
- E920 Accidents caused by cutting and piercing instruments or objects
- E921 Accident caused by explosion of pressure vessel
- E922 Accident caused by firearm and air gun missile
- E923 Accident caused by explosive material
- E924 Accident caused by hot substance or object, caustic or corrosive material, and steam
- E925 Accident caused by electric current
- E926 Exposure to radiation
- E927 Overexertion and strenuous and repetitive movements or loads
- E927.0 Overexertion from sudden strenuous movement
- E927.1 Overexertion from prolonged static position
- E927.2 Excessive physical exertion from prolonged activity
- E927.3 Cumulative trauma from repetitive motion
- E927.4 Cumulative trauma from repetitive impact
- E927.8 Other overexertion and strenuous and repetitive movements or loads
- E927.9 Unspecified overexertion and strenuous and repetitive movements or loads

== (E929) Late effects of accidental injury ==
- E929 Late effects of accidental injury
- E929.0 Late effects of motor vehicle accident
- E929.1 Late effects of other transport accident
- E929.2 Late effects of accidental poisoning
- E929.3 Late effects of accidental fall
- E929.4 Late effects of accident caused by fire
- E929.5 Late effects of accident due to natural and environmental factors
- E929.8 Late effects of other accidents
- E929.9 Late effects of unspecified accident

== (E930–E949) Drugs, medicinal and biological substances causing adverse effects in therapeutic use ==
- E930 Antibiotics causing adverse effects in therapeutic use
- E931 Other anti-infectives causing adverse effects in therapeutic use
- E932 Hormones and synthetic substitutes causing adverse effects in therapeutic use
- E933 Primarily systemic agents causing adverse effects in therapeutic use
- E934 Agents primarily affecting blood constituents causing adverse effects in therapeutic use
- E935 Analgesics antipyretics and antirheumatics causing adverse effects in therapeutic use
- E936 Anticonvulsants and anti-parkinsonism drugs causing adverse effects in therapeutic use
- E937 Sedatives and hypnotics causing adverse effects in therapeutic use
- E938 Other central nervous system depressants and anesthetics causing adverse effects in therapeutic use
- E939 Psychotropic agents causing adverse effects in therapeutic use
- E940 Central nervous system stimulants causing adverse effects in therapeutic use
- E941 Drugs primarily affecting the autonomic nervous system causing adverse effects in therapeutic use
- E942 Agents primarily affecting the cardiovascular system causing adverse effects in therapeutic use
- E943 Agents primarily affecting gastrointestinal system causing adverse effects in therapeutic use
- E944 Water mineral and uric acid metabolism drugs causing adverse effects in therapeutic use
- E945 Agents primarily acting on the smooth and skeletal muscles and respiratory system causing adverse effects in therapeutic use
- E946 Agents primarily affecting skin and mucous membrane ophthalmological otorhinolaryngological and dental drugs causing adverse effects in therapeutic use
- E947 Other and unspecified drugs and medicinal substances causing adverse effects in therapeutic use
- E948 Bacterial vaccines causing adverse effects in therapeutic use
- E949 Other vaccines and biological substances causing adverse effects in therapeutic use

== (E950–E959) Suicide and self-inflicted injury ==
- E950 Suicide and self-inflicted poisoning by solid or liquid substances
- E951 Suicide and self-inflicted poisoning by gases in domestic use
- E952 Suicide and self-inflicted poisoning by other gases and vapors
- E953 Suicide and self-inflicted injury by hanging, strangulation, and suffocation
- E954 Suicide and self-inflicted injury by submersion (drowning)
- E955 Suicide and self-inflicted injury by firearms, air guns and explosives
- E956 Suicide and self-inflicted injury by cutting and piercing instrument
- E957 Suicide and self-inflicted injury by jumping from high places
- E958 Suicide and self-inflicted injury by other and unspecified means
- E959 Late effects of self-inflicted injury

== (E960–E969) Homicide and injury purposely inflicted by other persons ==
- E960 Fight brawl rape
- E961 Assault by corrosive or caustic substance, except poisoning
- E962 Assault by poisoning
- E963 Assault by hanging and strangulation
- E964 Assault by submersion [drowning]
- E965 Assault by firearms and explosives
- E966 Assault by cutting and piercing instrument
- E967 Perpetrator of child and adult abuse
- E968 Assault by other and unspecified means
- E969 Late effects of injury purposely inflicted by other person

== (E970–E978) Legal intervention ==
- E970 Injury due to legal intervention by firearms
- E971 Injury due to legal intervention by explosives
- E972 Injury due to legal intervention by gas
- E973 Injury due to legal intervention by blunt object
- E974 Injury due to legal intervention by cutting and piercing instrument
- E975 Injury due to legal intervention by other specified means
- E976 Injury due to legal intervention by unspecified means
- E977 Late effects of injuries due to legal intervention
- E978 Legal execution

== V codes – Supplementary classification of factors influencing health status and contact with health services ==
- v01–v06 Persons with potential health hazards related to communicable diseases
  - V01 Contact with or exposure to communicable diseases
  - V02 Carrier or suspected carrier of infectious diseases
  - V03 Need for prophylactic vaccination and inoculation against bacterial diseases
  - V04 Need for prophylactic vaccination and inoculation against certain viral diseases
  - V05 Need for other prophylactic vaccination and inoculation against single diseases
  - V06 Need for prophylactic vaccination and inoculation against combinations of diseases
- v07–v09 Persons with need for isolation, Other potential health hazards and Prophylactic measures
  - V07 Need for isolation and other prophylactic measures
  - V08 [Asymptomatic] human immunodeficiency virus (HIV) infection status
  - V09 Infection with drug-resistant microorganisms
- v10–v19 Persons with potential health hazards related to personal and family history
  - V10 Personal history of malignant neoplasm (i.e. cancer)
  - V11 Personal history of mental disorder
  - V12 Personal history of certain other diseases
  - V13 Personal history of other diseases
  - V14 Personal history of allergy to medicinal agents
  - V15 Other personal history presenting hazards to health
  - V16 Family history of malignant neoplasm
  - V17 Family history of certain chronic disabling diseases
  - V18 Family history of certain other specific conditions
  - V19 Family history of other conditions
- v20–v29 Persons encountering health services in Circumstances related to Reproduction and development
  - V20 Health supervision of infant or child
  - V21 Constitutional states in development
  - V22 Normal pregnancy
  - V23 Supervision of high-risk pregnancy
  - V24 Postpartum care and examination
  - V25 Encounter for contraceptive management
  - V26 Procreative management
  - V27 Outcome of delivery
  - V28 Encounter for [antenatal] screening of mother
  - V29 Observation and evaluation of newborns for suspected conditions not found
- v30–v39 Live-born infants according to type of birth
  - V30 Single liveborn
  - V31 Twin birth mate liveborn
  - V32 Twin birth mate stillborn
  - V33 Twin birth unspecified whether mate liveborn or stillborn
  - V34 Other multiple birth (three or more) mates all liveborn
  - V35 Other multiple birth (three or more) mates all stillborn
  - V36 Other multiple birth (three or more) mates liveborn and stillborn
  - V37 Other multiple birth (three or more) unspecified whether mates liveborn or stillborn
  - V38 NOT USED
  - V39 Liveborn unspecified whether single twin or multiple
- v40–v49 Persons with a condition influencing their health status
  - V40 Mental and behavioral problems
  - V41 Problems with special senses and other special functions
  - V42 Organ or tissue replaced by transplant
  - V43 Organ or tissue replaced by other means
  - V44 Artificial opening status
  - V45 Other postprocedural states
  - V46 Other dependence on machines
  - V47 Other problems with internal organs
  - V48 Problems with head neck and trunk
  - V49 Other conditions influencing health status
- v50–v59 Persons encountering health services for specific procedures and aftercare
  - V50 Elective surgery for purposes other than remedying health states
  - V51 Aftercare involving the use of plastic surgery
  - V52 Fitting and adjustment of prosthetic device
  - V53 Fitting and adjustment of other device
  - V54 Other orthopedic aftercare
  - V55 Attention to artificial openings
  - V56 Encounter for dialysis and dialysis catheter care
  - V57 Care involving use of rehabilitation procedures
  - V58 Encounter for other and unspecified procedures and aftercare
  - V59 Donors
- v60–v69 Persons encountering health services in other circumstances
  - V60 Housing, household and economic circumstances
  - V61 Other family circumstances
  - V62 Other psychosocial circumstances
  - V63 Unavailability of other medical facilities for care
  - V64 Persons encountering health services for specific procedures not carried out
  - V65 Other persons seeking consultation
  - V66 Convalescence and palliative care
  - V67 Follow-up examination
  - V68 Encounters for administrative purposes
  - V69 Problems related to lifestyle
- v70–v82 Persons without reported diagnosis encountered during examination and investigation of individuals and populations
  - V70 General medical examination
  - V71 Observation and evaluation for suspected conditions not found
  - V72 Special investigations and examinations
  - V73 Special screening examination for viral and chlamydial diseases
  - V74 Special screening examination for bacterial and spirochetal diseases
  - V75 Special screening examination for other infectious diseases
  - V76 Special screening for malignant neoplasms
  - V77 Special screening for endocrine nutritional metabolic and immunity disorders
  - V78 Special screening for disorders of blood and blood-forming organs
  - V79 Special screening for mental disorders and developmental handicaps
  - V80 Special screening for neurological eye and ear diseases
  - V81 Special screening for cardiovascular respiratory and genitourinary diseases
  - V82 Special screening for other conditions
- v83–v84 Genetics
  - V83 Genetic carrier status
  - V84 Genetic susceptibility to disease
- v85 Body mass index
- v86 Estrogen receptor Status
- v87 Other Specified Personal Exposures And History Presenting Hazards To Health
- v88 Acquired Absence of Other Organs And Tissue
- v89 Other Suspected Conditions Not Found
- v90 Retained Foreign Body
- v91 Multiple Gestation Placenta Status
