= Sequela =

Pathological condition resulting from some disease, injury, or other trauma

A sequela (UK: /sɪˈkwiːlə/, US: /sɪˈkwɛlə/; usually used in the plural, sequelae /-iː/) is a pathological condition resulting from a disease, injury, therapy, or other trauma. Derived from the Latin word meaning "sequel", it is used in the medical field to mean a complication or condition following a prior illness or disease.

A typical sequela is a chronic complication of an acute condition—in other words, a long-term effect of a temporary disease or injury—which follows immediately from the condition. Sequelae differ from late effects, which can appear long after—even several decades after—the original condition has resolved.

In general, non-medical usage, the terms sequela and sequelae mean consequence and consequences.

== Examples and uses ==
Chronic kidney disease, for example, is sometimes a sequela of diabetes; "chronic constipation" or more accurately "obstipation" (that is, inability to pass stool or gas) is a sequela to an intestinal obstruction; and neck pain is a common sequela of whiplash or other trauma to the cervical vertebrae. Post-traumatic stress disorder may be a psychological sequela of one or more traumatic events. Sequelae of traumatic brain injury include headache, dizziness, anxiety, apathy, depression, aggression, cognitive impairments, personality changes, mania, and psychosis.

COVID-19 is also known to cause post-acute sequelae, known as long COVID, post-COVID syndrome, or post-acute sequelae of COVID-19 (PASC). This refers to the continuation of COVID-19 symptoms or the development of new ones, four or more weeks after the initial infection; these symptoms may persist for weeks and months. Post-COVID syndrome can occur in individuals who were asymptomatic for COVID, as well as those ranging from mild illness to severe hospitalization. These most commonly reported sequelae include fatigue, shortness of breath, chest pain, loss of smell, and brain fog; symptoms drastically range, from mild illness to severe impairment.

Some conditions may be diagnosed retrospectively from their sequelae. An example is pleurisy.

Other examples of sequelae include those following neurological injury; including aphasia, ataxia, hemi- and quadriplegia, and any number of other changes that may be caused by neurological trauma. Note that these pathologies can be related to both physical and chemical traumas, as both can cause lingering neuronal damage.

The phrase status post, abbreviated in writing as s/p, is used to discuss sequelae with reference to their cause. Clinicians typically use the phrase to refer to acute traumatic conditions. For example: "the patient had neck pain status post a motor vehicle accident".

Rheumatic fever is a non-suppurative sequela of a primary infection of group A Streptococcus bacteria. Glomerulonephritis can also be a non-suppurative sequela of Streptococcus pyogenes.
