= Macrocheilia =

- Specialty: Dermatology

Macrocheilia is a condition of permanent swelling of the lip that results from greatly distended lymphatic spaces. This causes an abnormal largeness of the lips. This is sometimes seen in leprosy patients.

== See also ==
- Nevus psiloliparus
- List of cutaneous conditions
