= Geniculate ganglionitis =

Geniculate neuralgia
- Specialty: Neurology

Geniculate ganglionitis or geniculate neuralgia (GN), also called nervus intermedius neuralgia, Ramsay Hunt syndrome, or Hunt's neuralgia, is a rare disorder characterized by severe paroxysmal neuralgic pain deep in the ear, that may spread to the ear canal, outer ear, mastoid or eye regions. GN may also occur in combination with trigeminal or glossopharyngeal neuralgia.

The pain of GN is sharp, shooting or burning and can last for hours. Painful attacks can be triggered by cold, noise, swallowing or touch, but triggers are usually unique to the sufferer. Other related symptoms that may be experienced include increased salivation, bitter taste, tinnitus and vertigo.

GN is rare, and only limited data is available regarding the incidence, prevalence, and risk factors associated with this condition. Middle-aged adults, however, seem to be predominantly affected, women more than men.

== Cause ==
GN may be caused by compression of somatic sensory branch of cranial nerve VII which goes through the nervus intermedius. In sufferers of GN, signals sent along these nerves are altered and interpreted by the geniculate ganglion (a structure in the brain) as GN pain. GN may also develop following herpes zoster oticus (Ramsay Hunt syndrome), where cold sores occur on the ear drum or ear. This may also be associated with facial paresis (weakness), tinnitus, vertigo and deafness. Disorders of lacrimation, salivation and/or taste sometimes accompany the pain. There is a common association with herpes zoster.

== Diagnosis ==
Diagnostic criteria:

A. Pain paroxysms of intermittent occurrence, lasting for seconds or minutes, in the depth of the ear

B. Presence of a trigger area in the posterior wall of the auditory canal

C. Not attributed to another disorder

== Treatment ==
=== Pharmacological ===
A trial of the anticonvulsant drug carbamazepine is common for patients diagnosed with GN. For patients who do not tolerate or respond to carbamazepine, alternative drugs include oxcarbazepine, gabapentin, phenytoin, lamotrigine, and baclofen. In addition, tricyclics (e.g., amitriptyline) and pregabalin are useful in other types of neuropathic pain.

=== Surgical ===
A variety of surgeries have been performed including microvascular decompression (MVD) of the fifth, ninth, and tenth nerves; as well as partial cutting of the nervus intermedius, geniculate ganglion, chorda tympani and/or the ninth and tenth cranial nerves.
