= Microcheilia =

- Specialty: Medical genetics

Microcheilia is a congenital disorder where one's lips are unusually small.
