= Monoplegia =

Paralysis of a single limb

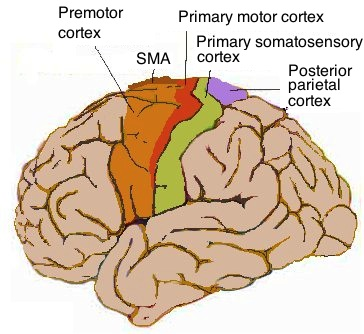
- Damage to the motor cortex can induce monoplegia.
- Specialty: Neurology
- Causes: Stroke, cerebral palsy, direct physical trauma to the affected limb, central nervous mass lesion, tumor, hematoma, or abscess, migraine, epilepsy, head or spinal trauma, brachial neuritis, neonatal brachial plexus paralysis, Brown Sequard, peripheral neuropathy, plexopathy, traumatic peroneal neuropathy, paralytic poliomyelitis, spinal muscular atrophy, seizures
- Differential diagnosis: Hemiplegia, paraplegia, quadriplegia

Monoplegia is paralysis of a single limb, usually an arm. Common symptoms associated with monoplegic patients are weakness, numbness, and pain in the affected limb. Monoplegia is a type of paralysis that falls under hemiplegia. While hemiplegia is paralysis of half of the body, monoplegia is localized to a single limb or to a specific region of the body. Monoplegia of the upper limb is sometimes referred to as brachial monoplegia, and that of the lower limb is called crural monoplegia. Monoplegia in the lower extremities is not as common of an occurrence as in the upper extremities. Monoparesis is a similar, but less severe, condition because one limb is very weak, not paralyzed. For more information, see paresis.

Many conditions that cause paraplegia or quadriplegia may initially present as monoplegia. Therefore, the possibility of spinal paraplegia should be considered during diagnosis. In addition, several cerebral disorders that can lead to hemiplegia may begin as monoplegia. Monoplegia is frequently associated with cerebral palsy and is often regarded as its mildest form.

== Signs and symptoms ==
There are a number of symptoms associated with monoplegia. Curling of the hands or stiffness of the feet, weakness, spasticity, numbness, paralysis, pain in the affected limb, headaches, and shoulder pain are all considered to be symptoms of monoplegia. Patients of monoplegia typically feel symptoms of weakness and loss of sensation in the affected extremity, usually an arm. Despite these symptoms, the extremity with paralysis continues to maintain a strong pulse.

While chronic progressive brachial monoplegia is uncommon, syringomyelia and tumors of the cervical cord or brachial plexus may be the cause. The onset of brachial plexus paralysis is usually explosive where pain is the initial feature. Pain localizes to the shoulder but may be more diffuse, or could be limited to the lower arm. Pain is severe and often described as sharp, stabbing, throbbing, or aching. The duration of pain, which is constant, varies from a span of several hours to 3 weeks. As the pain subsides, weakness usually appears. In addition, chronicle progressive weakness of one leg suggests a tumor of the spinal cord of the lumbar plexus. Fever is often the first symptom of lumbar plexus paralysis, followed by pain in one or both legs. The pain has an abrupt onset and may occur in a femoral or sciatic distribution. Weakness may develop concurrently with pain or be delayed for as long as 3 weeks. Furthermore, a monomeric form of spinal muscular atrophy, affecting only one leg or arm, should be considered when progressive weakness is not accompanied by sensory loss.

== Causes ==
Some potential causes of monoplegia are listed below.

1. Cerebral palsy
2. Direct physical trauma to the affected limb
3. Central nervous mass lesion, including tumor, hematoma, or abscess
4. Complicated migraine
5. Epilepsy
6. Head or spinal trauma
7. Hereditary brachial neuritis
8. Hereditary neuropathy with liability to pressure palsy
9. Neonatal brachial plexus paralysis
10. Neuropathy
11. Plexopathy
12. Traumatic peroneal neuropathy
13. Vaccine-associated paralytic poliomyelitis
14. Hemiparetic seizures
15. Monomeric spinal muscular atrophy
16. Stroke

Specifically, monoplegia in the lower extremities is typically caused by Brown Sequard syndrome and hematomas in the frontoparietal cortex near the middle that could produce a deficit such as this, but this is a very uncommon occurrence.

== Mechanism ==
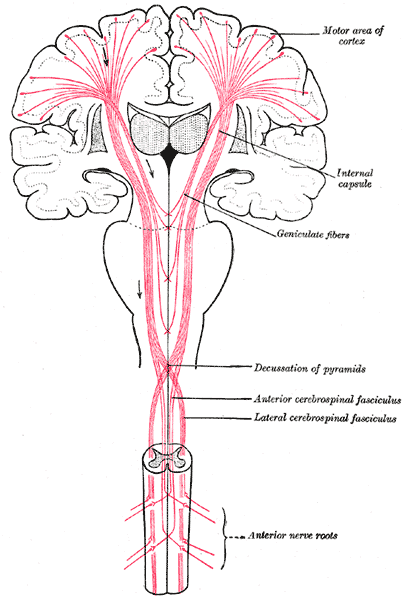
The motor tract.

In monoplegia, the spine and the proximal portion of nerves are usually the abnormal sites of limb weakness. Monoplegia resulting from upper extremity impairments following a stroke occurs due to direct damage to the primary motor cortex, primary somatosensory cortex, secondary sensorimotor cortex, sensorimotor cortical areas, subcortical structures, and/or the corticospinal tract. It is often found that impairments following stroke are either caused by damage to the same or adjacent neurological structures. A combination of these impairments is more likely than just one in isolation. Damage to the corticospinal system results in an inability to activate muscles with enough force or in a coordinated manner, which can lead to paresis, loss of fractional movement, and abnormal muscle tone. Damage to the somatosensory cortical areas causes loss of somatosensation which results in an impaired ability to monitor movement.

Considering monoplegia as it relates to cerebral palsy, in premature infants, the most common cause of cerebral palsy is periventricular hemorrhagic infarction. In term infants, the underlying causes are often cerebral malformations, cerebral infarction, and intracerebral hemorrhage. Delayed crawling or walking are the usual concerns that arise in infants with paralysis of the limb. In these cases, abnormalities of the legs are the main focus of the attention.

== Diagnosis ==
Monoplegia is diagnosed by a physician after a physical examination and sometimes after further neurologic examination as well. As monoplegia is fairly rare, after physical examination of a patient complaining of monoplegia, sometimes weakness of an additional limb is also identified and the patient is diagnosed with hemiplegia or paraplegia instead. After neurologic examination of the limb, a diagnosis of a monoplegic limb can be given if the patient receives a Medical Research Council power grade of 0, which is a measurement of the patient's limb strength. Needle Electromyography is often used to study all limbs, essentially showing the extent in each limb involvement. Furthermore, magnetic resonance imaging (MRI) is the diagnostic modality of choice for investigating all forms of hemiplegia. It is especially informative to show migrational defects in hemiplegic cerebral palsy associated with seizures.

An approach called single-pulse transcranial magnetic stimulation (spTMS) has also been used to help diagnose motor deficits such as monoplegia. This is done by evaluating the functional level of the corticospinal tract through stimulation of the corticospinal lesions in order to obtain neurophysiologic evidence on the integrity of the corticospinal tracts. Single-pulse transcranial magnetic stimulation provides neuropsychological feedback such as motor-evoked potentials (MEPs) and central motor conduction time (CMCT). This feedback can then be compared to the normal limits of patients who do not show evidence of deficits in the corticospinal tracts.

== Treatment ==
There is no cure for monoplegia, but treatments typically include physical therapy and counseling to help recover muscle tone and function. Recovery will vary depending on diagnosis of temporary, partial or complete paralysis. Much of the therapies focus on the upper limb due to the fact that monoplegia in the upper limbs is much more common than in the lower limbs. It has been found that intense activity-based and goal-directed therapy, such as constraint-induced movement therapy and bimanual therapy, are more effective than standard care. Studies suggest the less affected hand could provide a template for improving motor performance of the more affected hand, and provides a strong rationale for the development of bimanual training approaches. In addition to that, there is strong evidence to support that occupational therapy home programs that are goal-directed could be used to supplement hands-on direct therapy.

Constraint-induced movement therapy (CIMT) is specifically targeted at upper limb monoplegia as a result of a stroke. In CIMT the unaffected arm is restrained, forcing the use and frequent practice of the affected arm. This approach to therapy is carried out during ordinary and daily activities by the affected person. It has been found that CIMT is more effective at specifically improving arm movement than a physiotherapy approach or no treatment at all. This type of therapy has proved to provide an only moderate improvement in patients with monoplegia. More research needs to be conducted in order to establish the lasting benefit of constraint-induced movement therapy.

Brain computer interface (BCI) systems have been proposed as a tool for rehabilitation of monoplegia, specifically in the upper limb after a stroke. BCI systems provide sensory feedback in the brain via functional electrical stimulation, virtual reality environments, or robotic systems, which allows for the use of brain signals. This is extremely crucial because the networking in the brain is often compromised after a stroke, leading to impaired movement or paralysis. BCI systems allow for detection of intention to move through the primary motor cortex, then provide the matched sensory stimulation according to feedback that is provided. This leads to activity-dependent plasticity within the user, requiring them to pay careful attention to tasks that require the activation or deactivation of specific brain areas. BCI systems utilize different sources of information for feedback, including electroencephalography (EEG), magnetoencephalography, functional magnetic resonance imaging, near-infrared spectroscopy, or electrocorticography. Among all of these, the EEG signals are the most useful for this type of rehabilitation because they are highly accurate and stable.

Another form of treatment for monoplegia is functional electrical stimulation (FES). It is targeted at patients who acquired monoplegia through incidents such as a spinal cord injury, stroke, multiple sclerosis, or cerebral palsy and utilizes electrical stimulation in order to cause the remaining motor units in the paralyzed muscles to contract. As in traditional muscular training, FES improves the force with which the unaffected muscles contract. For less severely affected patients, FES allows for greater improvement in range of motion than traditional physical therapy.
