= Late effect =

Medical condition after the acute phase of an earlier, causal condition

In medicine, a late effect is a condition that appears after the acute phase of an earlier, causal condition has run its course. A late effect can be caused directly by the earlier condition, or by the treatment for the earlier condition. Some late effects can occur decades later. Historically, late effects have been very difficult to connect with their causes, but as survival and life span have increased and "follow up" has become standard practice, these connections are becoming established. A period, often very long, of health unaffected by both the initial and the late effect conditions distinguishes a late effect from a sequela or a complication. A code for such a condition was present in the ICD-9 but is no longer present in the ICD-10.

== Examples ==
- Chickenpox may be followed decades later by herpes zoster: see herpes zoster.
- Chemotherapy, radiation therapy and surgery to cure a cancer may result years later in another, unrelated cancer and/or infertility or subfertility: see oncofertility.
- Female survivors of childhood leukemia treated with cranial radiation therapy may be unable to breastfeed because they do not lactate.

== See also ==
- Adverse effect
