= Intermittent hydrarthrosis =

Recurring swelling primarily in the knee

Knee effusion
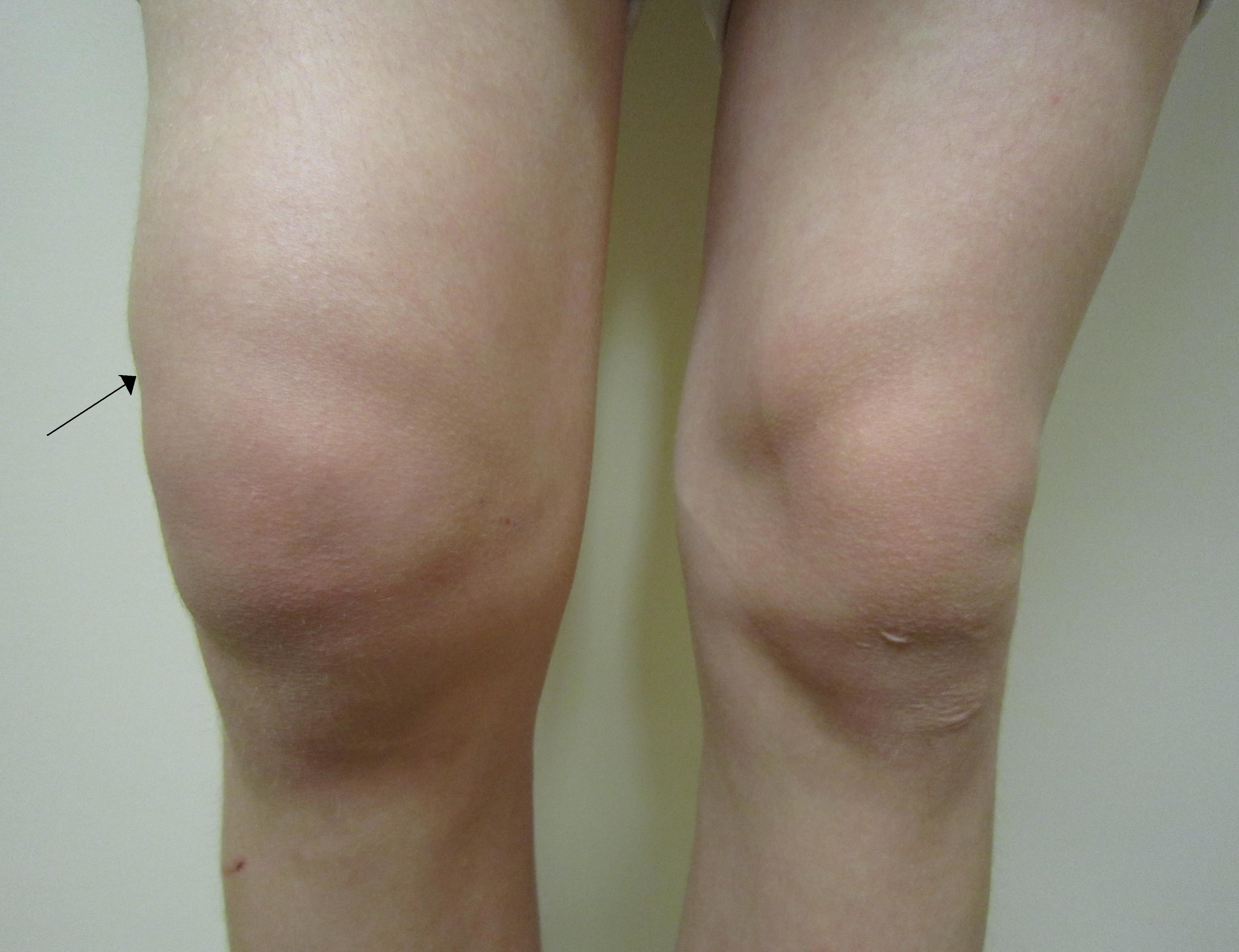
- Swollen right knee due to excess synovial fluid.
- Specialty: Rheumatology

Intermittent hydrarthrosis (IH), also known as periodic synoviosis, periodic benign synovitis, or periodic hydrarthritis, is a chronic condition of unknown cause characterized by recurring, temporary episodes of fluid accumulation (effusion) in the knee. While the knee is mainly involved, occasionally other joints such as the elbow or ankle can additionally be affected. Fluid accumulation in the joint can be extensive causing discomfort and impairing movement, although affected joints are not usually very painful. While the condition is chronic, it does not appear to progress to more destructive damage of the joint. It seems to affect slightly more women than men.

Episodes of swelling last several days or longer, can occur with regular or semi-regular frequency, typically one or two episodes per month. Between periods of effusion, knee swelling reduces dramatically providing largely symptomless intervals. Unlike some other rheumatological conditions such as rheumatoid arthritis, laboratory findings are usually within normal ranges or limits.

Clear treatment options have yet to be established. NSAIDs and COX2-inhibitors are generally not effective. Where this condition has been correctly diagnosed, various anti-rheumatic drugs as well as colchicine may be trialled to find the most effective option. More aggressive intra-articular treatment such chemical or radio-active synovectomy can also be helpful although benefits beyond 1 year have not been reported in literature.

== Signs and symptoms ==
Repeated, periodic joint effusions of the knee. Usually one knee is affected but sometimes both knees. Other joints may also be involved along with the knee. Effusions are large, restricting range of motion but significant pain is not a feature. There is usually stiffness. Tenderness of the joint may or may not be present. Aspirated synovial fluid is usually sterile but will sometimes show elevated cell count (>100 cells/mL) with 50% being polymorphonuclear leukocytes.

Onset of effusions are sudden with no particular trigger or stimulus. Each episode lasts for a few days to about a week and recurs in cycles of 7 to 11 days with extremes of 3 days to 30 days also reported. Sometimes the joint may begin to swell again as soon as the fluid has subsided. Where both knees are affected concurrently, as one joint ceases to swell the other may become involved.

The cycle of joints swellings have been reported as being very regular, even predictable. This has been a characteristic feature of IH in many case reports. However, over the longer-term especially, these cycles of effusion and recovery may not be as constant as first reported.

In women, many cases seem to begin at puberty. Episodes of knee swelling may coincide the menstrual cycle. In nearly all case reports, pregnancy seems to suppress the condition but after birth, during lactation, it returns.

In the main, patients are mostly free of other symptoms. Fever is rare. There no signs of local inflammation or lymphatic involvement. Laboratory tests are generally normal or within reference limits.

== Cause ==
The cause is unknown but allergic and auto-inflammatory mechanisms have been proposed.

In a 1957 review of IH, Mattingly did not find evidence that the condition is inherited unlike Reimann who, in 1974, describes the condition as “heritable, non-inflammatory, and afebrile”.

More recently, specific association with the Mediterranean fever gene, MEFV, has been proposed. So, with some individuals carrying gene mutations (MEFV and also TRAPS-related genes), the native immune system seems to plays a role in the development of IH, i.e. there is an auto-immune component to the condition.

== Pathophysiology ==
Involvement of mast cells has been reported reflecting a possible immunoallergic aspect to IH.

Mattingly suggests that IH may be an unusual variant of rheumatoid arthritis, and some patients may go on to develop RA. Joint damage however does not generally occur and only the synovial membrane is affected by a ‘non-inflammatory oedema’.

With regard to the periodic nature of effusions, Reimann theorises that: “…either an inherent rhythm or a feedback mechanism (Morley, 1970) excites 'bioclocks' in the hypothalamus or in the synovial membrane (Richter, 1960). These 'Zeitgebers' provoke sudden accumulation of plasma in the lining and spaces of joints, tendon and ligament sheaths.”

== Diagnosis ==
There is no specific test for this condition. Diagnosis is based on signs and symptoms, and exclusion of other conditions.

=== Differential diagnoses ===
- Rheumatoid arthritis. Confusion with rheumatoid arthritis may be common even though IH is a non-inflammatory condition without the many signs and symptoms associated with RA. So far, an association with HLA-B27 gene in IH has not been reported. With RA, small joints are mostly affected in an inflammatory, destructive manner. This is not observed in IH. Rheumatoid factor, cyclic citrullinated peptide antibodies and antinuclear antibodies are usually negative in IH.
- Palindromic rheumatism. Like IH, palindromic rheumatism (PR) is also characterised by relapsing, short-episodes of sudden onset arthritis with no recognisable trigger. However, unlike PR, IH affects the knee almost exclusively and there is a predictable periodic, regularity of attacks, with laboratory tests during attacks being generally unremarkable. PR is also more likely to be associated with development of rheumatoid arthritis.
- Familial Mediterranean Fever. For some patients with FMF, episodes of knee or joint inflammation may be the only presenting symptom during an acute inflammatory episode. The MEFV gene mutations associated with FMF have been implicated in the pathogenesis of both palindromic rheumatism and IH.
- Other conditions for consideration (or exclusion) are other periodic arthropathies, crystal arthopathy, prepatellar bursitis (housemaids knee), pigmented villonodular synovitis, trauma and infectious causes.

== Treatment ==
No treatment has been found to be routinely effective. NSAIDs and COX-2 inhibitors are not generally helpful other than for general pain relief. They do not seem to help reduce effusions or prevent their occurrence. Low-dose colchicine (and some other ‘anti-rheumatic’ therapies e.g. hydroxychloroquine) have been used with some success. (Use of methotrexate and intramuscular gold have not been reported in the literature). More aggressive treatments such as synovectomy, achieved using intra-articular agents (chemical or radioactive) can provide good results, with efficacy reported for at least 1 year.

Reducing acute joint swelling:

Arthrocentesis (or drainage of joint) may be useful to relieve joint swelling and improve range of motion. Local steroid injections can also reduce fluid accumulation short-term, but do not prevent onset of episodes. These treatments provide temporary relief only. Bed rest, ice packs splints and exercise are ineffective.

A single case report of a patient with treatment-refractory IH describes the use of anakinra, an interleukin 1 receptor antagonist. At the first sign of any attack, a single 100 mg dose was given. With this dosing at onset of attacks, each episode of effusion was successfully terminated.

Reducing frequency and severity of IH episodes:

Case reports indicate some success using long-term, low-dose colchicine (e.g. 0.5 mg to 1 mg daily). A recent single case report has shown hydroxychloroquine (300 mg daily) to be effective too.

Small-sized clinical trials have shown positive results with (1) chemical and (2) radioactive synovectomy. (1) Setti et al. treated 53 patients with rifampicin RV (600 mg intra-articular injections weekly for approximately 6 weeks) with good results at 1 year follow-up. (2) Top and Cross used single doses of intra-articular radioactive gold in 18 patients with persistent effusions of mixed causes including 3 with IH. All 3 patients with IH responded well to treatment at one-year follow-up.

== Prognosis ==
Once established, periods of remissions and relapse can persist indefinitely. While IH may remit spontaneously for most people the condition is long-lasting. Treatments as described above can be effective in reducing the frequency and degree of effusions. Deformative changes to joints are not a common feature of this mostly non-inflammatory condition.

== Epidemiology ==
Intermittent hydrarthrosis is uncommon and its prevalence is not known. (In 1974 more than 200 cases were reported in published literature). It affects men and women equally although some publications suggest the condition is slightly more prevalent in females. Case reports indicate that only white people are affected. First onset of IH is most common between the ages of 20 and 50 years, and in females, onset can often coincide with puberty.

Usually the condition begins spontaneously or following trauma to the joint in otherwise healthy individuals.

== History ==
Perrin (France) is reported to have first recorded this condition in 1845. The periodic nature of infusions was noted by CH Moore (Middlesex Hospital, UK) in 1852.

When the condition was first being reported in scientific journals, IH was classified as either ‘symptomatic’ or ‘idiopathic’ (of unknown cause). The symptomatic state was associated with existing disease such as rheumatoid arthritis, ankylosing spondylitis, other arthritis, or infection e.g. Brucellosis. With the idiopathic variant, an allergic component was believed to be involved since, in some patients at least, allergic phenomena (including cases of angioedema) were associated with episodes of inflammation. Rheumatoid disease did not develop in this latter variant.

Today, a primarily auto-immune cause predominates literature with speculation that IH may be an inherited condition

On the basis that IH is periodic in its presentation, early researchers proposed links with malaria where symptoms are also cyclical, even though the two have different duration cycles. Treatment with quinine (and arsenic) compounds were trialled with little benefit. Links to other infectious disease have also been posited over the years. These included Brucella, gonorrhoea, and syphilis.

Adrenaline injections, mercury, various hormone treatments (ovarian extracts, growth hormone, stilboestrol), and ergotamine tartrate are among other treatments at some time used without significant or long-term benefit. Physiotherapy, surgery, exclusion diets (following allergen testing) have similarly shown no particular success in early reports of IH.
