= Synovectomy =

Surgical removal of the synovial membrane of a joint

- ICD-9-CM: 80.7

Synovectomy is the surgical removal of the synovial tissue surrounding a joint. This procedure is typically recommended to provide relief from a condition in which the synovial membrane or the joint lining becomes inflamed and irritated and is not controlled by medication alone. If arthritis (inflammation of the joint) is not controlled, it can lead to irreversible joint damage. The synovial membrane or "synovium" encloses each joint and also secretes a lubricating fluid that allows different joint motions such as rolling, folding and stretching. When the synovium becomes inflamed or irritated, it increases fluid production, resulting in warmth, tenderness, and swelling in and around the joint.

A synovectomy is a procedure often suggested for those with rheumatoid arthritis or other forms of inflammatory arthritis when non-operative treatments have failed. This procedure can be performed in several ways, namely surgical synovectomy, chemical synovectomy and radiological.

The surgical procedure can be performed arthroscopically or by opening the joint to remove the synovial tissue surrounding the joint that has become inflamed and swollen. Chemical Synovectomy involves an intraarticular osmic acid injection with the objective to debulk or reduce the inflammatory synovial mass.

== Indications ==
Synovectomy is indicated in following conditions:

- Inflammatory arthritis: rheumatoid arthritis, hemophilia, chondromatosis
- Synovial tumors: pigmented villonodular synovitis
- Septic arthritis
- Joint stiffness

Synovectomy is to be performed before cartilage damage has occurred. Conditions, where Synovectomy can provide some relief, are listed below.

=== Pigmented villonodular synovitis (PVNS) ===
PVNS (Pigmented villonodular synovitis): is a joint problem that usually affects the shoulder, hip or knee. It can also affect the elbow, ankle, and hand or foot. In pigmented villonodular synovitis, the synovial joint lining becomes swollen and grows. It may harm the bone around the joint. The lining also makes extra fluid that can cause swelling and make movement difficult and painful.

=== Rheumatoid arthritis (RA) ===
Rheumatoid arthritis is a (chronic) long-term disease that causes pain, stiffness, swelling, decreases the range of motion of many joints. It affects any joint in the body commonly hands, knees, wrists, shoulder, elbow, hips, feet.

In rheumatoid arthritis (RA) the synovial membrane becomes inflamed, it can become edematous and thicken with inflammatory exudates. Moreover, similar conditions can also be seen in juvenile rheumatoid arthritis and psoriatic arthritis. Synovectomy for RA has become relatively rare because nowadays patients with Rheumatoid Arthritis have access to disease modifying drugs called biologics that are effective in containing the inflammation that damages the synovial tissue. In cases when the patient undergoes a rapid deterioration of joints, physicians lean towards a total knee replacement as the last recourse option. Still, in select cases where the patient is resistant to biologics as well as have higher risk factors for a TKR, synovectomy can still be looked into to provide some relief ranging anywhere from a one-year to three-year period. A study that analyzed patients who underwent Osmic Acid Synovectomy found that approximately 28% patients were in disease remission for their knee joint for over three years duration.

== Variants ==
Synoviorthesis, or medical synovectomy, may be achieved with the intra-articular injection of several substances:

- Osmic acid, rifampicin and rifamycin (i.e. chemosynovectomy)
- Yttrium-90, erbium-169, dysprosium-165 and rhenium-186 (radiosynovectomy)

== See also ==
- List of surgeries by type
