= Knee arthritis =

Inflammation of the knee joint

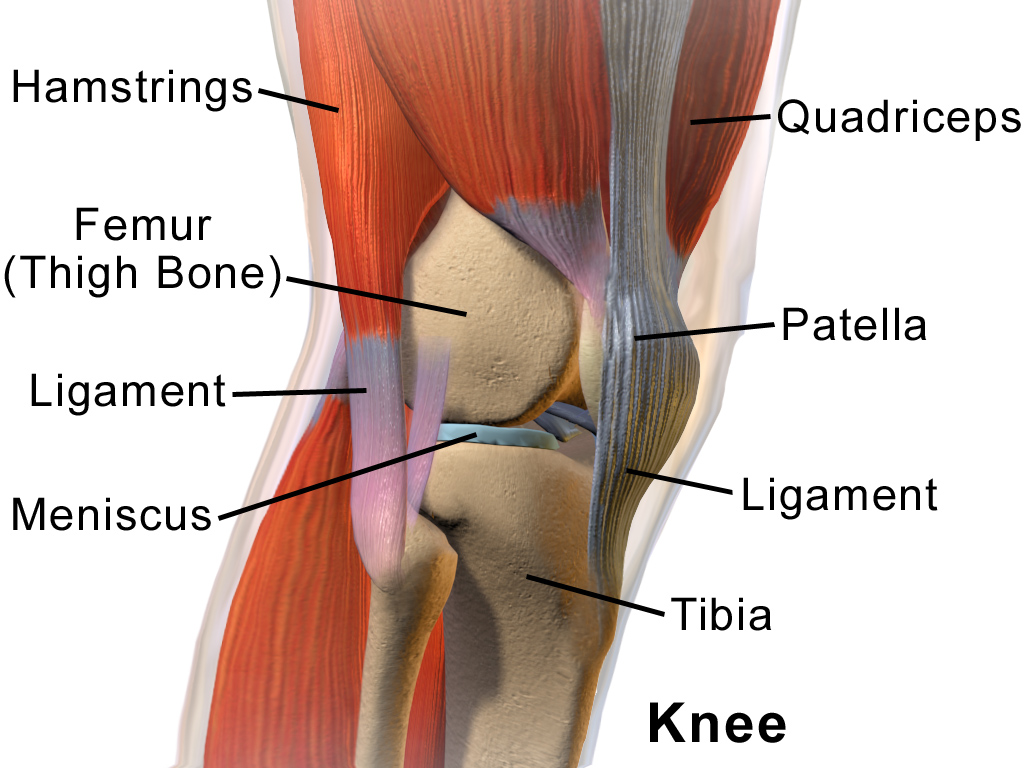
- Human knee
- Specialty: Rheumatology

Arthritis of the knee is typically a particularly debilitating form of arthritis. The knee may become affected by almost any form of arthritis.

The word arthritis refers to inflammation of the joints. Types of arthritis include those related to wear and tear of cartilage, such as osteoarthritis, to those associated with inflammation resulting from an overactive immune system (such as rheumatoid arthritis).

== Causes ==
The risk of knee arthritis increases after individual injuries to the cruciate and collateral ligaments, menisci, bone fractures or joint dislocation; the risk also increases with multistructure injuries, such as ligament-meniscal tears or patellar dislocation. Cartilage injury, meniscectomy, and degradation of the joint articular surfaces also increase the risk. Persons with tibiofemoral and patellofemoral joint injuries are susceptible to knee arthritis.

The knee may become affected by almost any form of arthritis, including those related to mechanical damage of the structures of the knee (osteoarthritis, and post-traumatic arthritis), various autoimmune forms of arthritis (including; rheumatoid arthritis, juvenile arthritis, and SLE-related arthritis, psoriatic arthritis, and ankylosing spondylitis), arthritis due to infectious causes (including Lyme disease-related arthritis), gouty arthritis, or reactive arthritis.

=== Osteoarthritis of the knee ===
The knee is one of the joints most commonly affected by osteoarthritis. Cartilage in the knee may begin to break down after sustained stress, leaving the bones of the knee rubbing against each other and resulting in osteoarthritis. Nearly a third of US citizens are affected by osteoarthritis of the knee by age 70.

Obesity is a known and significant risk factor for the development of osteoarthritis. Risk increases proportionally to body weight. Obesity contributes to OA development, not only by increasing the mechanical stress exerted upon the knees when standing, but also leads to increased production of compounds that may cause joint inflammation.

Parity is associated with an increased risk of knee OA and likelihood of knee replacement. The risk increases in proportion to the number of children the woman has birthed. This may be due to weight gain after pregnancy, or increased body weight and consequent joint stress during pregnancy.

Flat feet are a significant risk factor for the development of osteoarthritis. Additionally, structural deformities, advanced age, female sex, past joint trauma, genetic predisposition, and certain at-risk occupations may all contribute to the development of osteoarthritis in general.

=== Systemic lupus erythematosus ===
Arthritis is a common symptom of SLE. Arthritis is often symmetric and more often involves small joints. Though almost any joint may be affected, the knees and joints of the hands are most often involved in SLE. In larger joints (including the knee), avascular necrosis is a possible complication, leading to further pain and disability.

=== Reactive arthritis ===
Reactive arthritis often presents with lower limb oligoarthritis, including that of the knee.

=== Gout ===
Arthritis of a single joint of the lower extremities with rapid onset is highly suggestive of gouty arthritis. The knee may be affected. In cases of gouty arthritis of the knee, skin symptoms occur less often, but pain and swelling may be particularly intense.

=== Rheumatoid arthritis ===
RA most often first manifests as inflammation of particular finger or toe joints, however, pain and swelling of larger joints, including the knees, may also be the first sign.

== Diagnosis ==
=== Osteoarthritis of the knee ===
Diagnosis of knee osteoarthritis often entails a physical examination, assessment of symptoms and the patient's medical history, but may also involve medical imaging and blood tests. Persistent knee pain, limited morning stiffness and reduced function, crepitus, restricted movement, and bony enlargement appear to be the most useful indications of knee osteoarthritis for diagnosis.

Standardized medical questionnaires like the Knee injury and Osteoarthritis Outcome Score (KOOS) or the Western Ontario and McMaster Universities Osteoarthritis Index (WOMAC) can also be used to diagnose and monitor progression of knee osteoarthritis.

== Management ==
A physician will recommend a treatment regimen based upon the severity of symptoms. General recommendations for the management of knee arthritis may include avoiding activities that aggravate the condition, and applying cold or warm packs and using ointments and creams to relieve symptoms.

=== Pharmaceutical ===
Pharmaceutical management is usually dependent upon the nature of the underlying condition causing arthritis. Over-the-counter medications like acetaminophen (paracetamol), and ibuprofen, naproxen, and other NSAIDs are often used as first-line medical treatments for pain relief and/or managing inflammation. Corticosteroids may be injected directly into the joint cavity to provide more significant relief from inflammation, swelling, and pain. Other medications used in management of arthritis of the knee include; disease-modifying antirheumatic drugs, biopharmaceuticals, viscosupplementation (including hyaluronic acid injections), and glucosamine and chondroitin sulphate.

Hyaluronic acid is normally present in joints (including the knee), acting as lubricant and providing shock absorption, among other functions. In osteoarthritis, there is a loss of articular hyaluronic acid activity, likely contributing to pain and stiffness associated with the condition. Hyaluronic acid injections are an FDA-approved treatment for osteoarthritis of the knee, and are sometimes also used for other joints. However, the merits of HA injections are still disputed. HA injections are indicated when other medications fail to offer adequate symptom relief. Symptom relief associated with HA injections may last up to 2 years after an injection. HA injections appear to offer significant pain relief to some patients, while others may see no benefits at all. In severe osteoarthritis without much cartilage, the benefits of hyaluronic are not observed.

=== Orthotics ===
Supportive devices like knee braces can be used for symptom relief in osteoarthritis of the knee. Knee braces may however result in discomfort, skin irritation, swelling, and may not provide benefits to all. Using a cane, shock-absorbent footwear and inserts, elastic bandages, and knee sleeves may also be helpful for managing arthritis symptoms. Braces may be especially effective when only one knee is affected. Shoe insoles that are fitted to correct flat feet provide significant relief to those with severely flat feet. However, it has been found that insoles used to correct medial knee osteoarthritis (the more common form) may not offer much pain relief.

=== Lifestyle ===
==== Body weight ====
Obesity is a known and very significant risk factor for the development of osteoarthritis. Furthermore, losing weight reduces mechanical stress acting upon the knees when standing, possibly reducing pain and improving function in knee osteoarthritis. However, it is necessary to ascertain whether the patient is actually overweight before committing to weight loss as a management technique.

==== Exercise ====
Exercises can help increase range of motion and flexibility as well as help strengthen the muscles in the leg. Physical therapy and exercise are often effective in reducing pain and improving function. A Cochrane review could not conclude whether high-intensity exercises provide better results than low-intensity exercises.

=== Surgical ===
Surgical intervention may be undertaken if no other management technique yields adequate relief. Surgical procedures may entail an arthroscopy (seldom used for sole osteoarthritis), osteotomy (performed only for unilateral early-stage osteoarthritis), or arthroplasty.

Knee replacement is the most definitive treatment for osteoarthritis-related symptoms and disability. It is a type of arthroplasty, and may involve either a partial or total replacement with a prosthesis.

=== Alternative medicine ===
Alternative medicine interventions undertaken for pain relief in arthritis of the knee include acupuncture, and magnetic pulse therapy.
