= Hemarthrosis =

Medical condition

- Other names: Haemarthrosis
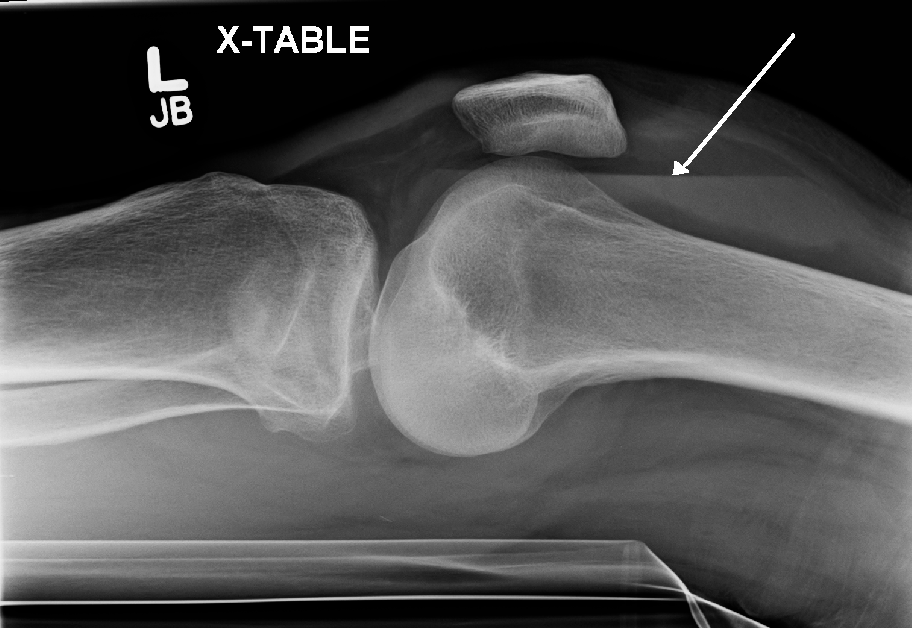
- Lipohemarthrosis (blood and fat in the joint space) seen in a person with a subtle tibial plateau fracture. The arrow indicates a fluid level between the upper fat component and the lower blood component.
- Specialty: Rheumatology
- Symptoms: Joint pain, swelling, and redness

Hemarthrosis is a bleeding into joint spaces. It is a common feature of hemophilia.

== Causes ==
It usually follows injury but occurs mainly in patients with a predisposition to hemorrhage such as those being treated with warfarin (or other anticoagulants) and patients with hemophilia.

It can be associated with knee joint arthroplasty.

It has also been reported as a part of hemorrhagic syndrome in the Crimean-Congo Hemorrhagic Fever, suggesting a viral cause to the bleeding in a joint space.

== Diagnosis ==
Synovial fluid examination
Type	WBC (per mm^{3})	% neutrophils	Viscosity	Appearance
Normal	<200	0	High	Transparent
Osteoarthritis	<5000	<25	High	Clear yellow
Trauma	<10,000	<50	Variable	Bloody
Inflammatory	2,000–50,000	50–80	Low	Cloudy yellow
Septic arthritis	>50,000	>75	Low	Cloudy yellow
Gonorrhea	~10,000	60	Low	Cloudy yellow
Tuberculosis	~20,000	70	Low	Cloudy yellow
Inflammatory: Arthritis, gout, rheumatoid arthritis, rheumatic fever

Hemarthrosis is diagnosed through the methods listed below:

A physical examination is the first step, with the joints of the patient moved and bent to study possible loss of functioning.

Synovial fluid analysis is another method to diagnose Hemarthrosis. It involves a small needle being inserted into the joint to draw the fluid. Reddish-colored hue of the sample is an indication of the blood being present. Imaging tests are normally done. The tests also include MRI, ultrasound and X-ray test, which give better information about the joint inflammation. Although MRI is superior method for this assessment, the US using the HEAD-US method performed by paediatric radiologists is a reliable tool for detection and quantification of haemophilic arthropathy in children in comparison to MRI.

== Treatment ==
In hemophilia it may occur spontaneously, and recurrent hemarthroses are a major cause of disability in that patient group due to hemophilic arthropathy, requiring synovectomy, joint replacement and increased medical therapy to prevent further bleeding episodes.

Reducing hemarthroses events using intravenous administration of blood clotting factor concentrate on a regular basis starting in early childhood, reduces joint deterioration and increases the person's quality of life compared to "on demand" treatment (treating after a bleed). The minimal effective dose and best dosage frequency have not been established. It is not clear, due to lack of sufficient data, if preventative therapy with clotting factor concentrate is also effective at reducing joint deterioration if treatment is started after joint damage has occurred.

== Complications ==
Up to a quarter of all severe ligament or capsular knee injuries leading to a hemarthrosis are associated with cartilage damage that can lead to progressive degenerative arthritis.

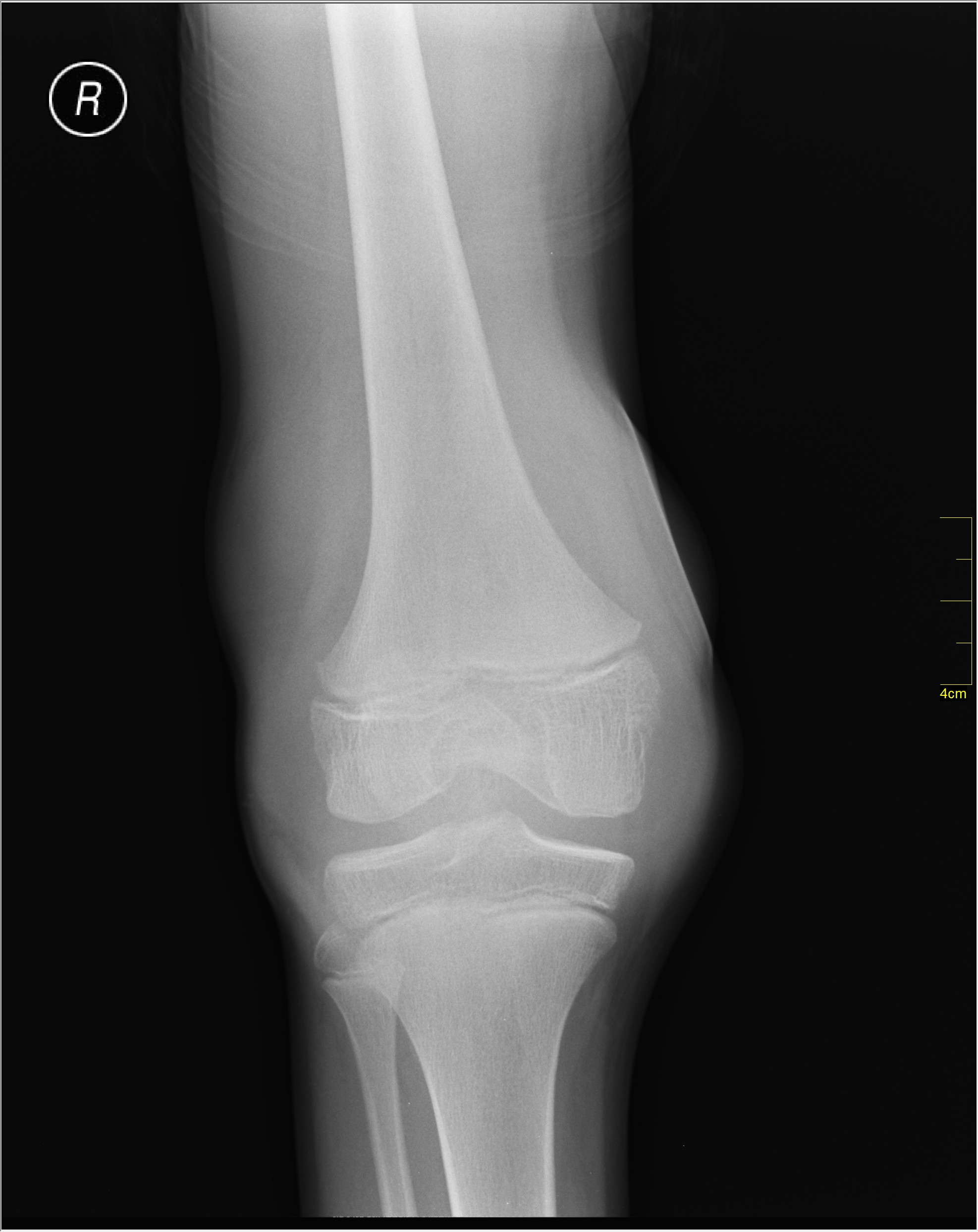
X-ray of Hemarthrosis

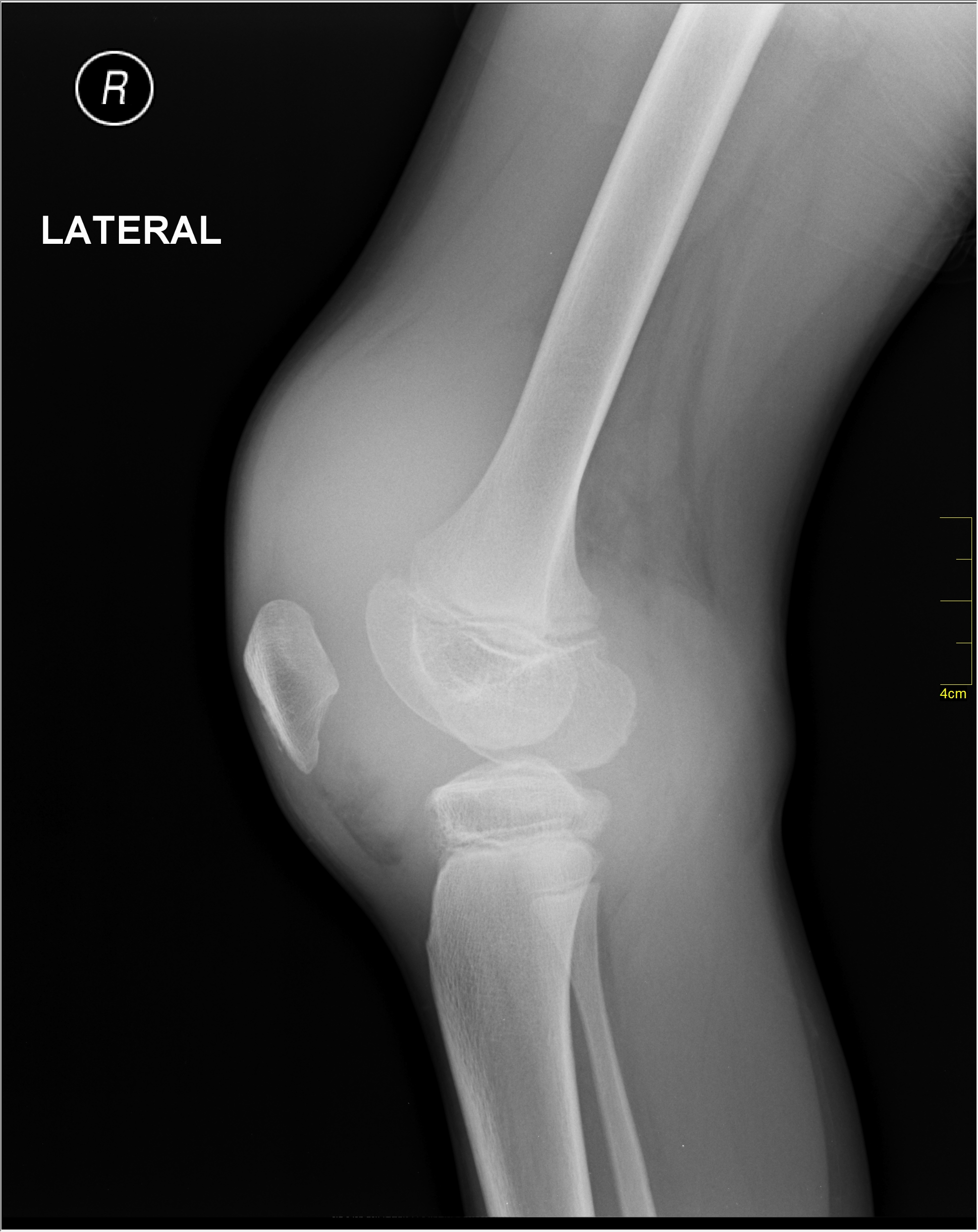
X-ray of Hemarthrosis
