= Joint effusion =

Swelling of a joint

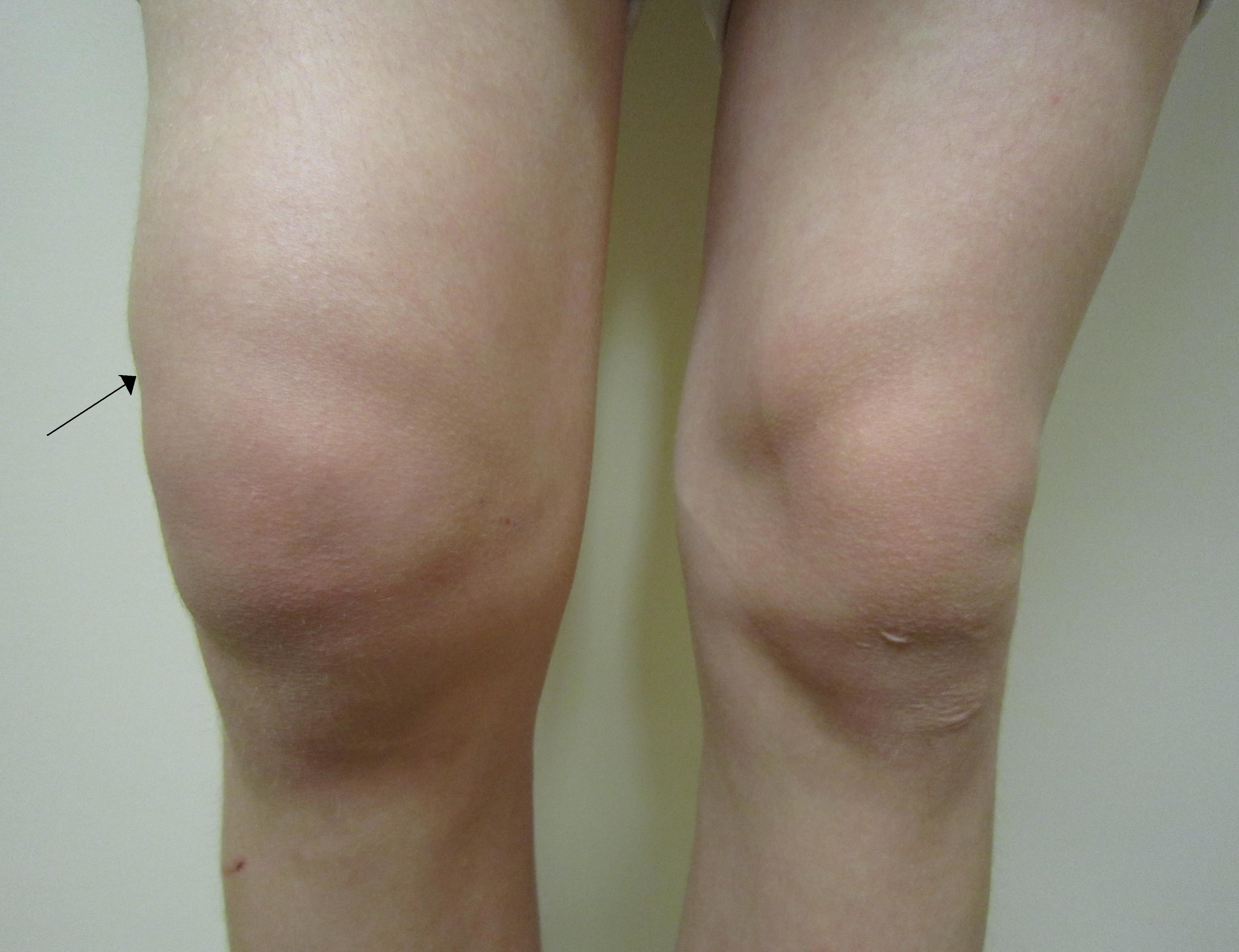
- A traumatic right knee effusion. Note the swelling lateral to the kneecap as marked by the arrow.
- Specialty: Orthopedics, rheumatology

A joint effusion is the presence of increased intra-articular fluid. It may affect any joint. Commonly it involves the knee (see knee effusion).

== Diagnostic approach ==
The approach to diagnosis depends on the joint involved. While aspiration of the joint is considered the gold standard of treatment, this can be difficult for joints such as the hip. Ultrasound may be used both to verify the existence of an effusion and to guide aspiration.

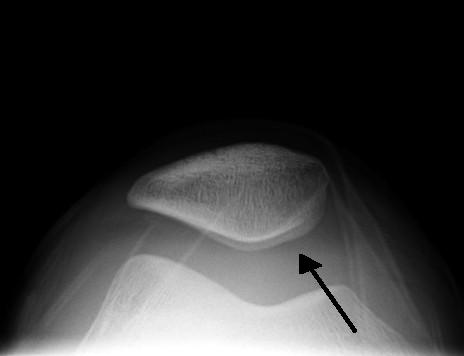
Skyline view of the patella demonstrating a large joint effusion as marked by the arrow.

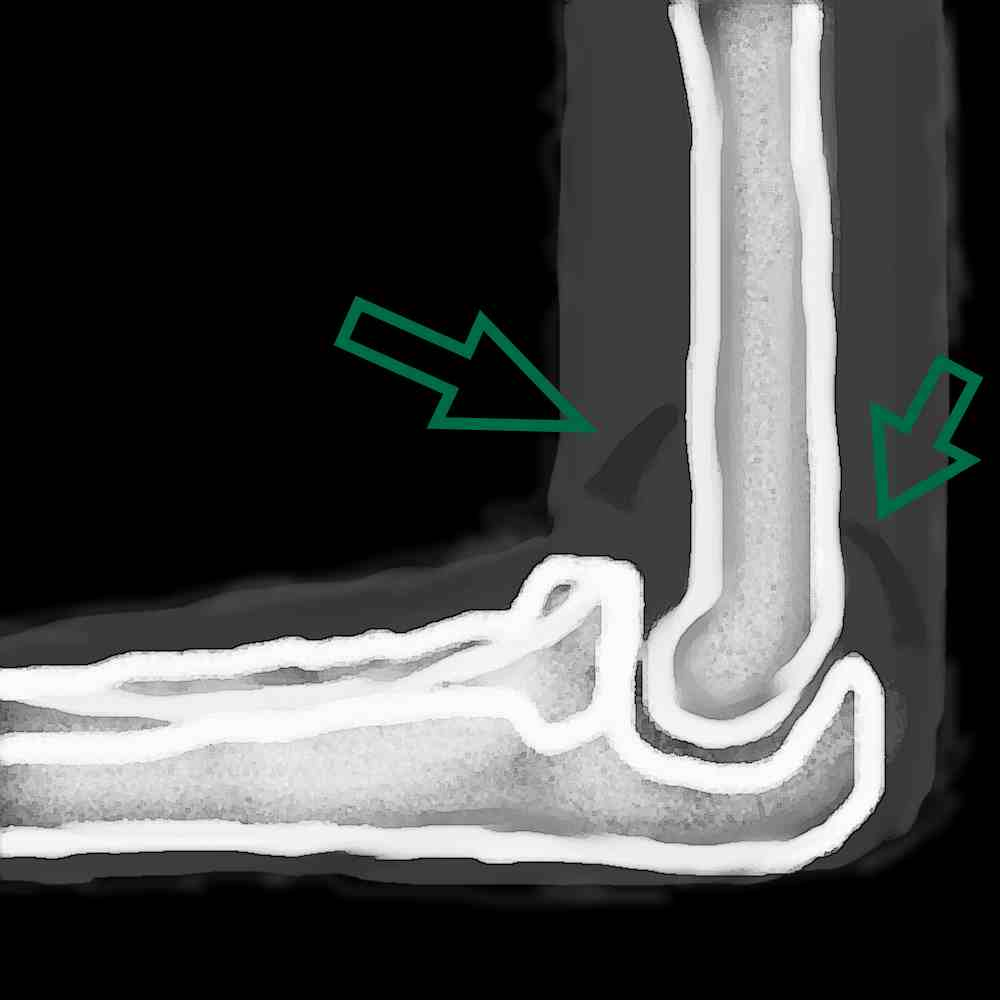
A schematic drawing showing the sail sign which represents an effusion.

=== Differential diagnosis ===
Synovial fluid examination
Type	WBC (per mm^{3})	% neutrophils	Viscosity	Appearance
Normal	<200	0	High	Transparent
Osteoarthritis	<5000	<25	High	Clear yellow
Trauma	<10,000	<50	Variable	Bloody
Inflammatory	2,000–50,000	50–80	Low	Cloudy yellow
Septic arthritis	>50,000	>75	Low	Cloudy yellow
Gonorrhea	~10,000	60	Low	Cloudy yellow
Tuberculosis	~20,000	70	Low	Cloudy yellow
Inflammatory: Arthritis, gout, rheumatoid arthritis, rheumatic fever

There are many causes of joint effusion. It may result from trauma, inflammation, hematologic conditions, or infections.

==== Septic arthritis ====
Septic arthritis is the purulent invasion of a joint by an infectious agent with a resultant large effusion due to inflammation. Septic arthritis is a serious condition. It can lead to irreversible joint damage in the event of delayed diagnosis or mismanagement. It is basically a disease of children and adolescence.

==== Gout ====
Gout is usually present with recurrent attacks of acute inflammatory arthritis (red, tender, hot, swollen joint). It is caused by elevated levels of uric acid in the blood that crystallizes and deposits in joints, tendons, and surrounding tissues. Gout affects 1% of individuals in Western populations at some point in their lives.

==== Trauma ====
Trauma from ligamentous, osseous or meniscal injuries can result in an effusion. These are often hemarthrosis or bloody effusions.

== Treatment ==
The treatment for joint effusion includes icing, rest and medication as advised by a doctor.

== See also ==
- Swelling (medical)
- Intermittent hydrarthrosis
