= Arthritis =

Type of joint disorder

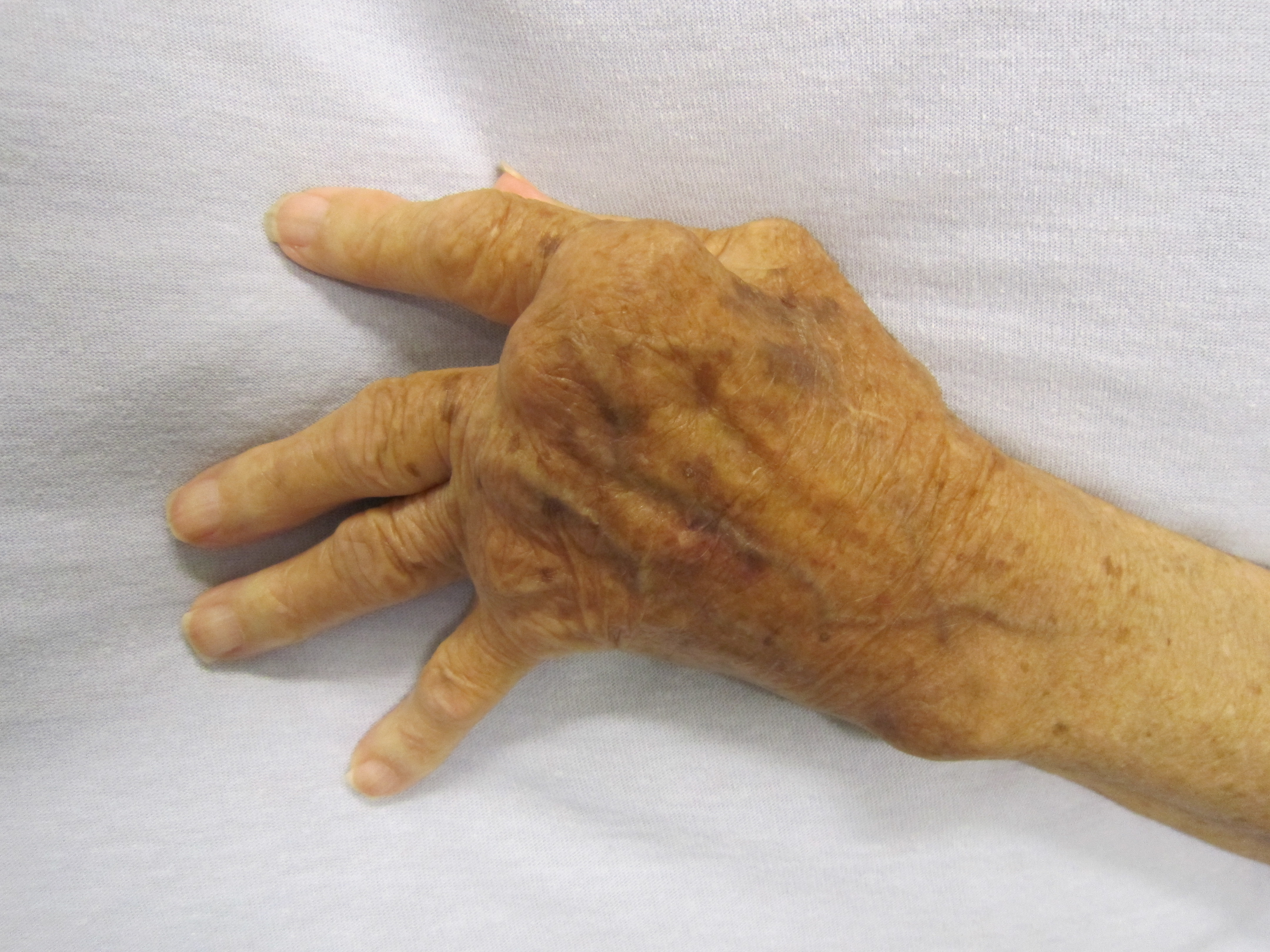
- A hand affected by rheumatoid arthritis, an autoimmune form of arthritis
- Pronunciation: /ɑːrˈθraɪtɪs/
- Specialty: Rheumatology
- Symptoms: Joint pain, stiffness, redness, swelling, decreased range of motion
- Complications: Amplified musculoskeletal pain syndrome
- Types: > 100, most common (osteoarthritis, rheumatoid arthritis)
- Risk factors: Family history, age, sex, previous joint injury, obesity.
- Treatment: Resting, applying ice or heat, weight loss, exercise, joint replacement
- Medication: Ibuprofen, paracetamol (acetaminophen)

Arthritis is a general medical term used to describe a disorder in which the smooth cartilagenous layer that lines a joint is lost, resulting in bone grinding on bone during joint movement. Symptoms generally include joint pain and stiffness. Other symptoms may include redness, warmth, swelling, and decreased range of motion of the affected joints. In certain types of arthritis, other organs, such as the skin, are also affected. Onset can be gradual or sudden.

There are several types of arthritis. The most common forms are osteoarthritis (most commonly seen in weight-bearing joints) and rheumatoid arthritis. Osteoarthritis usually occurs as a person ages and often affects the hips, knees, shoulders, and fingers. Rheumatoid arthritis is an autoimmune disorder that often affects the hands and feet. Other types of arthritis include gout, lupus, spondyloarthritis, and septic arthritis. These are inflammatory based types of rheumatic disease.

Early treatment for arthritis commonly includes resting the affected joint and conservative measures such as heating or icing. Weight loss and exercise may also be useful to reduce the force across a weight-bearing joint. Medication intervention for symptoms depends on the form of arthritis. These may include anti-inflammatory medications such as ibuprofen and paracetamol (acetaminophen). With severe cases of arthritis, joint replacement surgery may be necessary.

Osteoarthritis is the most common form of arthritis affecting more than 3.8% of people, while rheumatoid arthritis is the second most common affecting about 0.24% of people. In Australia about 15% of people are affected by arthritis, while in the United States more than 20% have a type of arthritis. Overall arthritis becomes more common with age. Arthritis is a common reason people are unable to carry out their work and can result in decreased ability to complete activities of daily living. The term arthritis is derived from arthr- (meaning 'joint') and -itis (meaning 'inflammation').

== Classification ==
There are several diseases where joint pain is the most prominent symptom. Generally when a person has "arthritis" it means that they have one of the following diseases:

- Hemarthrosis
- Osteoarthritis
- Rheumatoid arthritis
- Gout and pseudogout
- Septic arthritis
- Ankylosing spondylitis
- Juvenile idiopathic arthritis
- Still's disease
- Psoriatic arthritis

Joint pain can also be a symptom of other diseases. In this case, the person may not have arthritis and instead have one of the following diseases:

- Psoriasis
- Reactive arthritis
- Ehlers–Danlos syndrome
- Iron overload
- Hepatitis
- Lyme disease
- Sjögren's disease
- Hashimoto's thyroiditis
- Celiac disease
- Non-celiac gluten sensitivity
- Inflammatory bowel disease (including Crohn's disease and ulcerative colitis)
- Henoch–Schönlein purpura
- Hyperimmunoglobulinemia D with recurrent fever
- Sarcoidosis
- Whipple's disease
- TNF receptor associated periodic syndrome
- Granulomatosis with polyangiitis (and many other vasculitis syndromes)
- Familial Mediterranean fever
- Systemic lupus erythematosus

An undifferentiated arthritis is an arthritis that does not fit into well-known clinical disease categories, possibly being an early stage of a definite rheumatic disease.

== Signs and symptoms ==
Extra-articular features of joint disease
Cutaneous nodules
Cutaneous vasculitis lesions
Lymphadenopathy
Oedema
Ocular inflammation
Urethritis
Tenosynovitis (tendon sheath effusions)
Bursitis (swollen bursa)
Diarrhea
Orogenital ulceration

Pain in varying severity is a common symptom in most types of arthritis. Other symptoms include swelling, joint stiffness, redness, and aching around the joint(s). Arthritic disorders like lupus and rheumatoid arthritis can affect other organs in the body, leading to a variety of symptoms including:

- Inability to use the hand or walk
- Stiffness in one or more joints
- Rash or itch
- Malaise and fatigue
- Weight loss
- Poor sleep
- Muscle aches and pains
- Tenderness
- Difficulty moving the joint

== Causes ==
Several factors contribute to the development of arthritis, differing on the type of arthritis.

Osteoarthritis occurs from damage to joint cartilage from prior injury or long-term wear-and-tear, resulting in bone-to-bone contact and grinding. The resulting arthritis can occur over years, or be worsened by further injury or infection. If joint cartilage is severely damaged, inflammation and swelling may add to the extent and pain of osteoarthritis.

In rheumatoid arthritis, the immune system itself, which normally serves to protect against infection and diseases, attacks the lining of the joint capsule, causing inflammation and swelling.

Gout is a form of arthritis caused by excessive uric acid production, resulting in urate crystals depositing in joints, particularly in extremities, such as toes. Urate levels in the blood may increase from consuming purine-rich foods or from body factors affecting urate clearance from the blood, a topic remaining under study.

Arthritis types may also include ankylosing spondylitis, juvenile idiopathic arthritis, psoriatic arthritis, and reactive arthritis, among others.

== Risk factors ==
There are common risk factors that increase a person's chance of developing arthritis later in adulthood. Some of these are modifiable while others are not.

Some common risk factors that can increase the chances of developing osteoarthritis include obesity, prior injury to the joint, type of joint, and muscle strength.

The risk factors with the strongest association for developing inflammatory arthritis (such as rheumatoid arthritis and lupus arthritis) are the female sex, a family history, age, obesity, joint damage from a previous injury, and exposure to tobacco smoke.

Smoking has been linked to an increased susceptibility of developing arthritis, particularly rheumatoid arthritis.

== Diagnosis ==
Synovial fluid examination
Type	WBC (per mm^{3})	% neutrophils	Viscosity	Appearance
Normal	<200	0	High	Transparent
Osteoarthritis	<5000	<25	High	Clear yellow
Trauma	<10,000	<50	Variable	Bloody
Inflammatory	2,000–50,000	50–80	Low	Cloudy yellow
Septic arthritis	>50,000	>75	Low	Cloudy yellow
Gonorrhea	~10,000	60	Low	Cloudy yellow
Tuberculosis	~20,000	70	Low	Cloudy yellow
Inflammatory: Arthritis, gout, rheumatoid arthritis, rheumatic fever

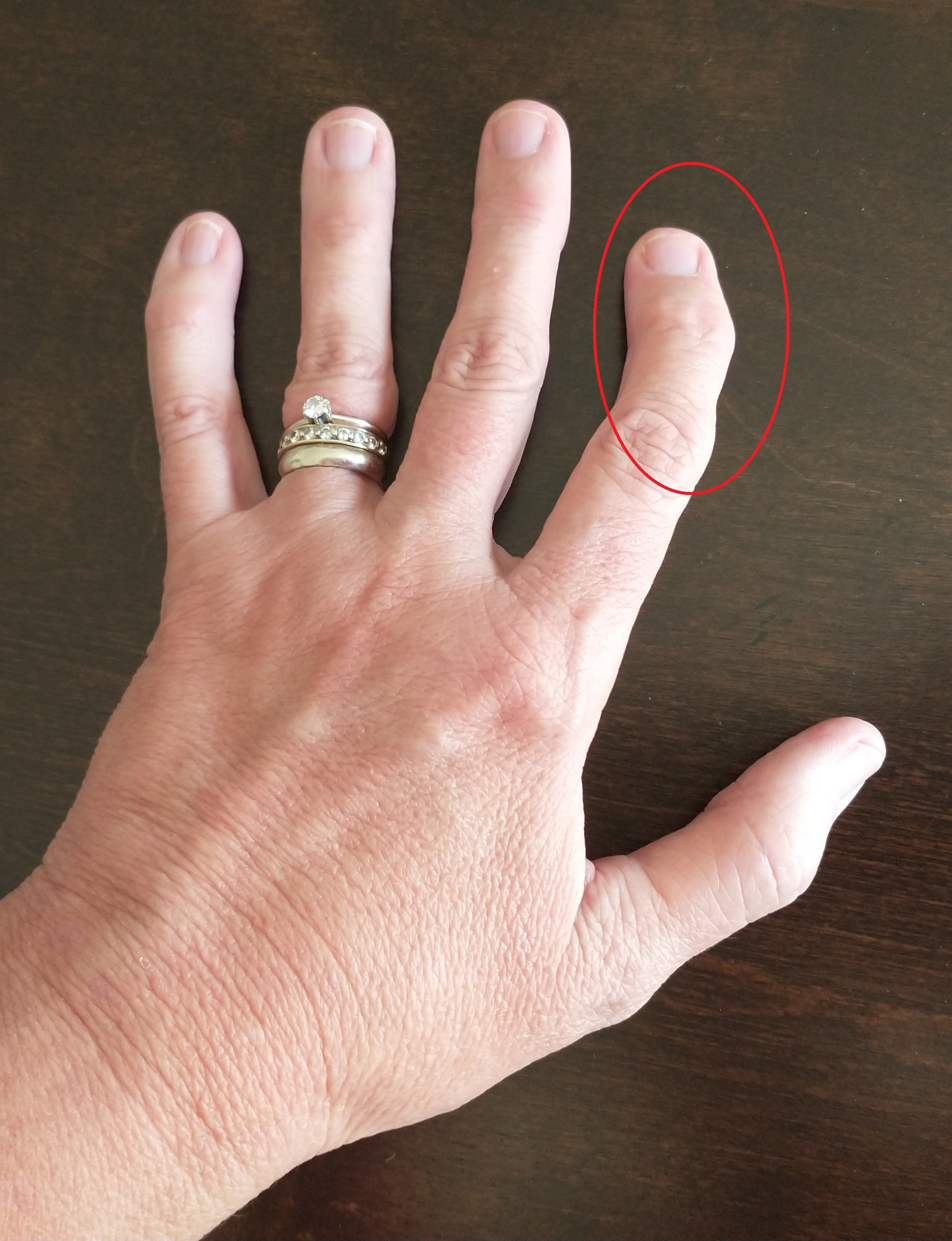
Osteoarthritis in the left hand index finger of a 63-year-old woman

Diagnosis is made by clinical examination from an appropriate health professional, and may be supported by tests such as radiologic imaging and blood tests, depending on the type of suspected arthritis. Pain patterns may vary depending on the type of arthritis and the location. Rheumatoid arthritis is generally worse in the morning and associated with stiffness lasting over 30 minutes. On the other hand, with osteoarthritis, the pain tends to initially be related to activity and then becomes more constant over time.

Important features to look out for include the following:

- Rate of onset of symptoms
- Pattern of joint involvement
- Symmetry of symptoms
- Early morning stiffness
- Associated tenderness around the joint
- Locking of joint with inactivity
- Aggravating and relieving factors, and/or
- Presence of systemic symptoms

Physical examination may include observing the affected joints, evaluating gait, and examining the skin for findings that could be related to rheumatological disease or pulmonary inflammation. Physical examination may confirm the diagnosis or may indicate systemic disease. Chest radiographs are often used to follow progression or help assess severity.

Screening blood tests for suspected arthritis include: rheumatoid factor, antinuclear factor (ANF), extractable nuclear antigen, and specific antibodies.

Rheumatoid arthritis patients often have elevated erythrocyte sedimentation rate (ESR, also known as sed rate) or C-reactive protein (CRP) levels, which indicates the presence of an inflammatory process in the body. Anti-cyclic citrullinated peptide (anti-CCP) antibodies and rheumatoid factor (RF) are two more common blood tests when assessing for rheumatoid arthritis.

Imaging tests like X-rays are commonly utilized to diagnose and monitor arthritis. Other imaging tests for rheumatoid arthritis that may be considered include computed tomography (CT) scanning, positron emission tomography (PET) scanning, bone scanning, and dual-energy X-ray absorptiometry (DEXA).

=== Osteoarthritis ===
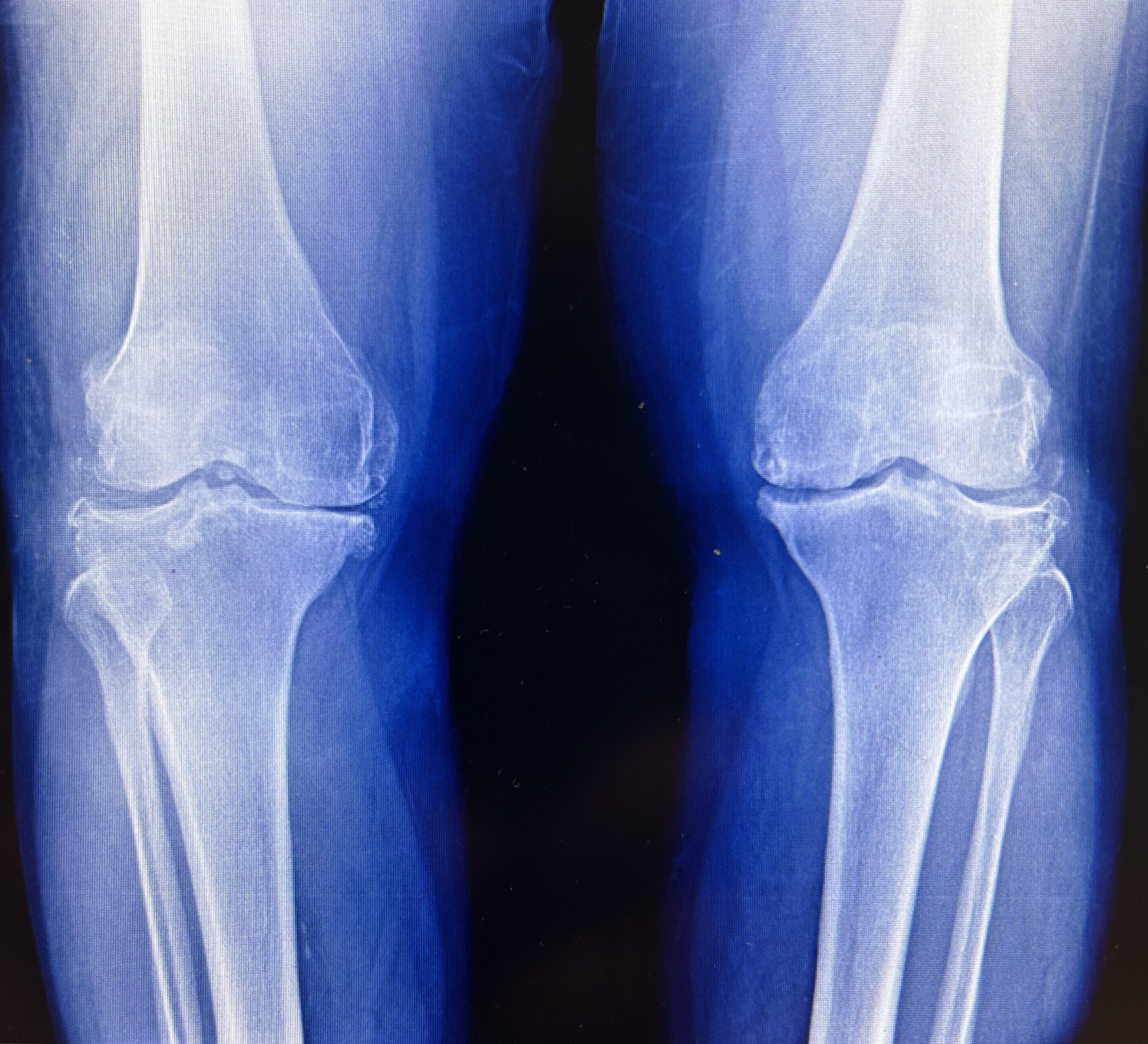
Bilateral medial joint space narrowing with osteophytes in varus knees with osteoarthritis

Osteoarthritis (OA) is the most common form of arthritis. It affects humans and other animals like dogs, cats, and horses. It can affect both the larger joints (i.e. knee, hip, shoulder, etc.) and the smaller joints (i.e. fingers, toes, foot, etc.) of the body. Caused by daily wear and tear of the joint, this can speed up its progression. OA results from cartilage breakdown, leading to bones rubbing directly and eroding each other. The symptoms typically begin with minor pain during physical activity, but can eventually progress to be present at rest. The pain can be debilitating and prevent one from doing activities that they would normally do as part of their daily routine. OA typically affects the weight-bearing joints, such as the back, knee and hip due to the mechanical nature of this disease process. Unlike rheumatoid arthritis, OA is more common in the elderly, with increased age being the strongest predictor, likely due to declining chondrocytes ability to maintain cartilage. Over 30 percent of women have some degree of OA by age 65. The primary diagnostic tool for OA is X-ray imaging of the joint. Findings on X-ray that are consistent with OA include joint space narrowing (due to cartilage breakdown), bone spurs, sclerosis, and bone cysts.

=== Rheumatoid arthritis ===
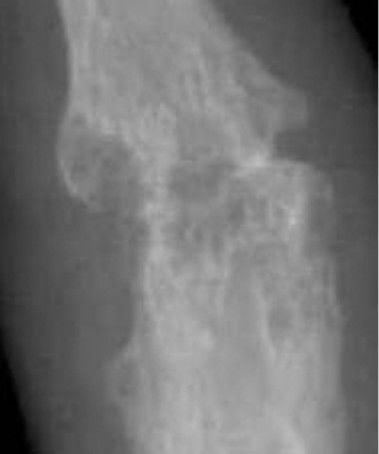
Bone erosions by rheumatoid arthritis

Rheumatoid arthritis (RA) is a disorder in which the body's own immune system starts to attack body tissues specifically the cartilage at the end of bones known as articular cartilage. The attack is not only directed at the joint but to many other parts of the body. RA often affects joints in the fingers, wrists, knees and elbows, is symmetrical (appears on both sides of the body), and can lead to severe progressive deformity in a matter of years if not adequately treated. RA usually onsets earlier in life than OA and commonly affects people aged 20 and above. In children, the disorder can present with a skin rash, fever, pain, disability, and limitations in daily activities. With earlier diagnosis and appropriate aggressive treatment, many individuals can obtain control of their symptoms leading to a better quality of life compared to those without treatment.

One of the main triggers of bone erosion in the joints in rheumatoid arthritis is inflammation of the synovium (lining of the joint capsule), caused in part by the production of pro-inflammatory cytokines and receptor activator of nuclear factor kappa B ligand (RANKL), a cell surface protein present in Th17 cells and osteoblasts. Osteoclast activity can be directly induced by osteoblasts through the RANK/RANKL mechanism.

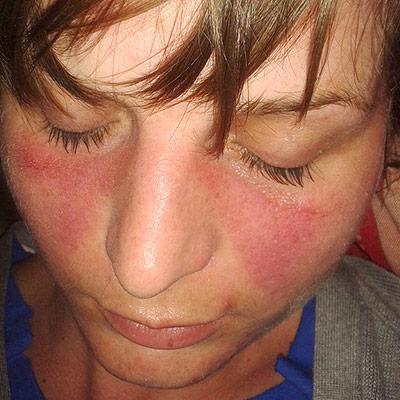
This is a malar ("butterfly") skin rash that is commonly seen in patients with Lupus.

=== Lupus ===
Lupus is an autoimmune collagen vascular disorder that can be present with severe arthritis. In fact, about 90% of patients with Lupus have musculoskeletal involvement. Symptoms in these patients can often mimic those of rheumatoid arthritis with similar stiffness and pain patterns. Joints in the fingers, wrist, and knee tend to be the most affected. Other features commonly seen in patients with Lupus include a skin rash (pictured on the right), extreme photosensitivity, hair loss, kidney problems, and shortness of breath secondary to scarring that occurs in the lungs.

=== Gout ===
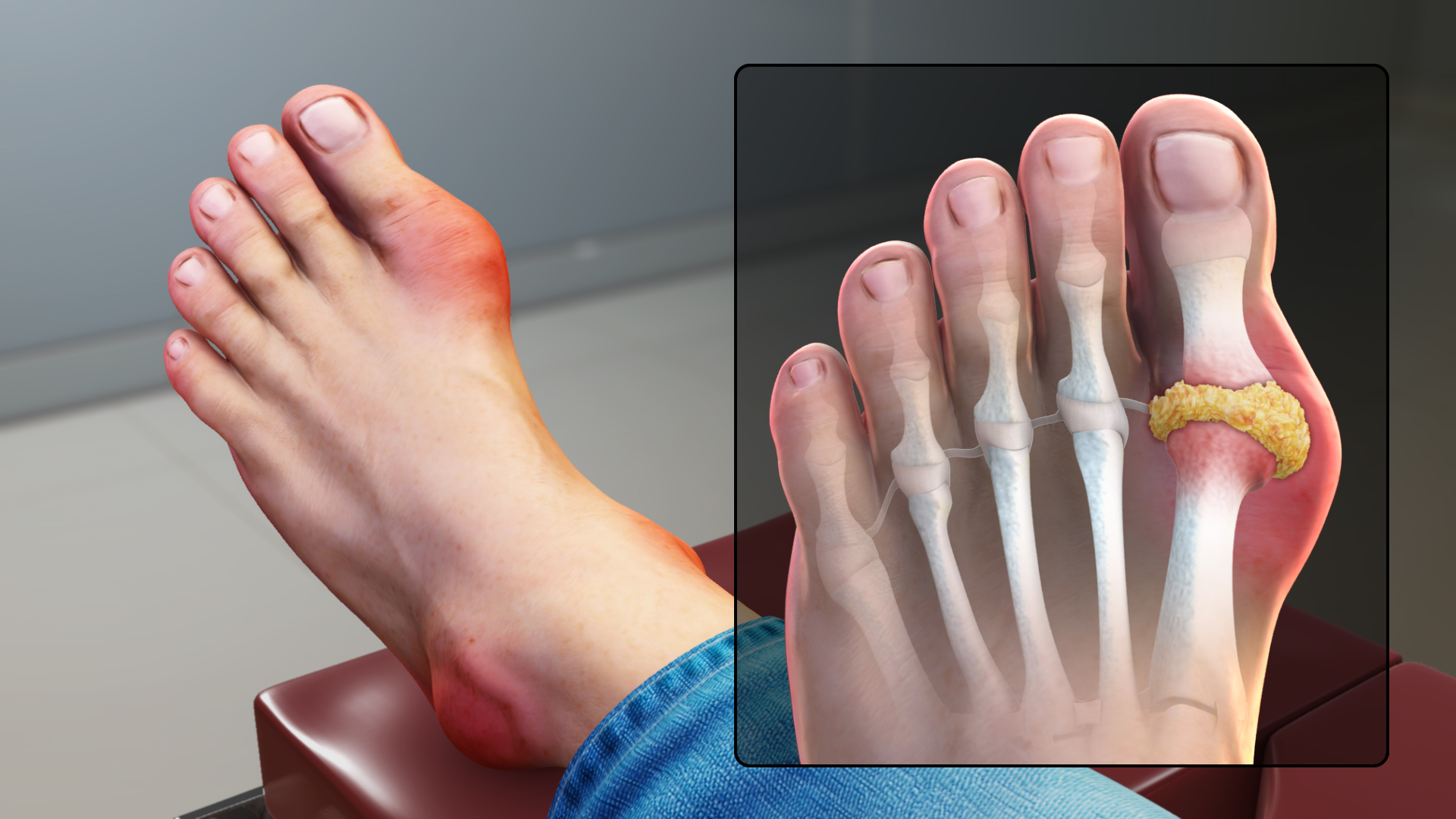
Gout most commonly affects the big toe, leading to swelling, redness, and warmth around that area.

In the early stages of gout, usually only one joint is affected; however over time, many joints can become affected. Gout most commonly occurs in joints located in the big toe, knee, and/or fingers. During a gout flare, the affected joints often become swollen with associated warmth and redness. The resulting pain can be significant and potentially debilitating. When one of these flares occurs, management involves the use of anti-inflammatories, such as NSAIDs, colchicine, or glucocorticoids. In between gout flares, it is recommended that patients take medications that decrease the production of uric acid (i.e. allopurinol, febuxostat) or increase the elimination of uric acid from the body (i.e. probenecid).

Gout has been associated with excessive intake of alcohol and food, such as red meat. Thus, it is also recommended that patients with gout adhere to a diet rich in fiber, vegetables, and whole grains, while limiting the intake of alcohol and fatty foods.

There is also an uncommon form of gout that is known as pseudogout, which is caused by the formation of calcium pyrophosphate crystals in the joint. Unlike gout, no targeted treatments are currently available. At this time, management is aimed at decreasing inflammation in order to reduce the intensity and frequency of flares.

=== Comparison of types ===
Comparison of some major forms of arthritis
	Osteoarthritis	Rheumatoid arthritis	Gouty arthritis
Speed of onset	Months-Years	Weeks-months	Hours for an attack
Main locations	Weight-bearing joints (such as knees, hips, vertebral column) and hands	Hands (proximal interphalangeal and metacarpophalangeal joint) wrists, ankles, knees and hips	Great toe, ankles, knees and elbows
Inflammation	May occur, though often mild compared to inflammation in rheumatoid arthritis	Yes	Yes
Radiologic changes	Narrowed joint space; Osteophytes; Local osteosclerosis; Subchondral cysts	Narrowed joint space; Bone erosions	"Punched out" bone erosions
Laboratory findings	None	Anemia, elevated ESR and C-reactive protein (CRP), rheumatoid factor, anti-citrullinated protein antibody	Crystal in joints
Other features	No systemic signs; Bouchard's and Heberden's nodes	Extra-articular features are common; Ulnar deviation, swan neck- and Boutonniere deformity of the hand	Tophi; Nephrolithiasis

=== Other ===
Infectious arthritis is another severe form of arthritis that is sometimes referred to as septic arthritis. It typically occurs when a patient is ill or has an infection. Common symptoms include the sudden onset of chills, fever, and joint pain. The condition is caused by bacteria that spread through the blood stream from elsewhere in the body. This bacteria can travel to specific joints and start to erode cartilage. Infectious arthritis must be rapidly diagnosed and treated promptly in order to prevent irreversible joint damage. Only about 1% of cases of infectious arthritis are a result of viruses. Within recent years, the virus SARS-CoV-2, which causes COVID-19, has been added to this list. SARS-CoV-2 tends to cause reactive arthritis rather than local septic arthritis.

Psoriasis can develop into psoriatic arthritis. With psoriatic arthritis, most individuals first develop skin symptoms (such as scaly patches and itchiness) and then begin to experience joint related symptoms. They typically experience continuous joint pain, stiffness and swelling like other forms of arthritis. This disease can go into remission, but there is currently no known cure for the disorder. Treatment current revolves around decreasing autoimmune attacks with immune suppressive medications. A small percentage of patients with psoriatic arthritis can develop a severely painful and destructive form of arthritis which destroys the small joints in the hands and sometimes lead to permanent disability and loss of hand function.

== Treatment ==
There is no known cure for arthritis and rheumatic diseases. Treatment options vary depending on the type of arthritis and include physical therapy, exercise and diet, orthopedic bracing, and oral and topical medications. Joint replacement surgery may be required to repair damage, restore function, or relieve pain.

=== Physical therapy ===
In general, studies have shown that physical exercise of the affected joint can noticeably improve long-term pain relief. Furthermore, exercise of the arthritic joint is encouraged to maintain the health of the particular joint and the overall body of the person.

Individuals with arthritis can benefit from both physical and occupational therapy. In arthritis the joints become stiff and the range of movement can be limited. Physical therapy has been shown to significantly improve function, decrease pain, and delay the need for surgical intervention in advanced cases. Exercise prescribed by a physical therapist has been shown to be more effective than medications in treating osteoarthritis of the knee. Exercise often focuses on improving muscle strength, endurance and flexibility. In some cases, exercises may be designed to train balance. Occupational therapy can provide assistance with activities. Assistive technology is a tool used to aid a person's disability by reducing their physical barriers by improving the use of their damaged body part, typically after an amputation. Assistive technology devices can be customized to the patient or bought commercially.

=== Medications ===
There are several types of medications that are used for the treatment of arthritis. Treatment typically begins with medications that have the fewest side effects with further medications being added if insufficiently effective.

Depending on the type of arthritis, the medications that are given may be different. For example, the first-line treatment for osteoarthritis is acetaminophen (paracetamol) while for inflammatory arthritis it involves non-steroidal anti-inflammatory drugs (NSAIDs) like ibuprofen. Opioids and NSAIDs may be less well tolerated. However, topical NSAIDs may have better safety profiles than oral NSAIDs. For more severe cases of osteoarthritis, intra-articular corticosteroid injections may also be considered.

The drugs to treat rheumatoid arthritis (RA) range from corticosteroids to monoclonal antibodies given intravenously. Due to the autoimmune nature of RA, treatments may include not only pain medications and anti-inflammatory drugs, but also another category of drugs called disease-modifying antirheumatic drugs (DMARDs). csDMARDs, TNF biologics and tsDMARDs are specific kinds of DMARDs that are recommended for treatment. Treatment with DMARDs is designed to slow down the progression of RA by initiating an adaptive immune response, in part by CD4+ T helper (Th) cells, specifically Th17 cells. Th17 cells are present in higher quantities at the site of bone destruction in joints and produce inflammatory cytokines associated with inflammation, such as interleukin-17 (IL-17).

=== Surgery ===
A number of surgical interventions have been incorporated in the treatment of arthritis since the 1950s. The primary surgical treatment option of arthritis is joint replacement surgery known as arthroplasty. Common joints that are replaced due to arthritis include the shoulder, hip, and knee. Arthroscopic surgery for osteoarthritis of the knee provides no additional benefit to patients when compared to optimized physical and medical therapy. Joint replacement surgery can last anywhere from 15 to 30 years depending on the patient. Following joint replacement surgery, patients can expect to get back to several physical activities including those such as swimming, tennis, and golf.

=== Adaptive aids ===
People with hand arthritis can have trouble with simple activities of daily living tasks (ADLs), such as turning a key in a lock or opening jars, as these activities can be cumbersome and painful. There are adaptive aids or assistive devices (ADs) available to help with these tasks, but they are generally more costly than conventional products with the same function. It is now possible to 3D-print adaptive aids, which have been released as open source hardware to reduce patient costs. Adaptive aids can significantly help arthritis patients and the vast majority of those with arthritis need and use them.

=== Alternative medicine ===
Further research is required to determine if transcutaneous electrical nerve stimulation (TENS) for knee osteoarthritis is effective for controlling pain.

Low level laser therapy may be considered for relief of pain and stiffness associated with arthritis. Evidence of benefit is tentative.

Pulsed electromagnetic field therapy (PEMFT) has tentative evidence supporting improved functioning but no evidence of improved pain in osteoarthritis. The FDA has not approved PEMFT for the treatment of arthritis. In Canada, PEMF devices are legally licensed by Health Canada for the treatment of pain associated with arthritic conditions.

== Epidemiology ==
Arthritis is predominantly a disease of the elderly, but children can also be affected by the disease. Arthritis is more common in women than men at all ages and affects all races, ethnic groups and cultures. In the United States, a CDC survey based on data from 2013 to 2015 showed 54.4 million (22.7%) adults had self-reported doctor-diagnosed arthritis, and 23.7 million (43.5% of those with arthritis) had arthritis-attributable activity limitation (AAAL). With an aging population, this number is expected to increase. Adults with co-morbid conditions, such as heart disease, diabetes, and obesity, were seen to have a higher than average prevalence of doctor-diagnosed arthritis (49.3%, 47.1%, and 30.6% respectively).

Disability due to musculoskeletal disorders increased by 45% from 1990 to 2010. Of these, osteoarthritis is the fastest increasing major health condition.

Among the many reports on the increased prevalence of musculoskeletal conditions, data from Africa are lacking and underestimated. A systematic review assessed the prevalence of arthritis in Africa and included twenty population-based and seven hospital-based studies. The majority of studies, twelve, were from South Africa. Nine studies were well-conducted, eleven studies were of moderate quality, and seven studies were conducted poorly. The results of the systematic review were as follows:

- Rheumatoid arthritis: 0.1% in Algeria (urban setting); 0.6% in Democratic Republic of Congo (urban setting); 2.5% and 0.07% in urban and rural settings in South Africa respectively; 0.3% in Egypt (rural setting), 0.4% in Lesotho (rural setting)
- Osteoarthritis: 55.1% in South Africa (urban setting); ranged from 29.5 to 82.7% in South Africans aged 65 years and older
  - Knee osteoarthritis has the highest prevalence from all types of osteoarthritis, with 33.1% in rural South Africa
- Ankylosing spondylitis: 0.1% in South Africa (rural setting)
- Psoriatic arthritis: 4.4% in South Africa (urban setting)
- Gout: 0.7% in South Africa (urban setting)
- Juvenile idiopathic arthritis: 0.3% in Egypt (urban setting)

== History ==
Evidence of osteoarthritis and potentially inflammatory arthritis has been discovered in dinosaurs. The first known traces of human arthritis date back as far as 4500 BC. In early reports, arthritis was frequently referred to as the most common ailment of prehistoric peoples. It was noted in skeletal remains of Native Americans found in Tennessee and parts of what is now Olathe, Kansas. Evidence of arthritis has been found throughout history, from Ötzi, a mummy (c. 3000 BC) found along the border of modern Italy and Austria, to the Egyptian mummies c. 2590 BC.

In 1703, William Musgrave published the first edition of his most important medical work, De arthritide symptomatica, which concerned arthritis and its effects. Augustin Jacob Landré-Beauvais, a 28-year-old resident physician at Salpêtrière Asylum in France was the first person to describe the symptoms of rheumatoid arthritis. Though Landré-Beauvais' classification of rheumatoid arthritis as a relative of gout was inaccurate, his dissertation encouraged others to further study the disease.

John Charnley completed the first hip replacement (total hip arthroplasty) in England to treat arthritis in the 1960s.

== Society and culture ==
Arthritis is the most common cause of disability in the United States. More than 20 million individuals with arthritis in the United States have severe limitations in function on a daily basis. Absenteeism and frequent visits to the physician are common in individuals who have arthritis. Arthritis can make it difficult for individuals to be physically active and some become homebound. In 2013, arthritis-attributable medical care costs and earnings losses among U.S. adults totaled an estimated $303.5 billion.

== Terminology ==
The term is derived from arthr- (from Ancient Greek: ἄρθρον, romanized: árthron, lit. 'joint') and -itis (from -ῖτις, -îtis, lit. 'pertaining to'), the latter suffix having come to be associated with inflammation.

The word arthritides is the plural form of arthritis, and denotes the collective group of arthritis-like conditions.

== See also ==
- Antiarthritics
- Arthritis UK (charity in the UK)
- Arthritis Foundation (US not-for-profit)
- Knee arthritis
- Osteoimmunology
- Weather pains
