= Joint replacement =

Orthopedic surgery to replace a joint

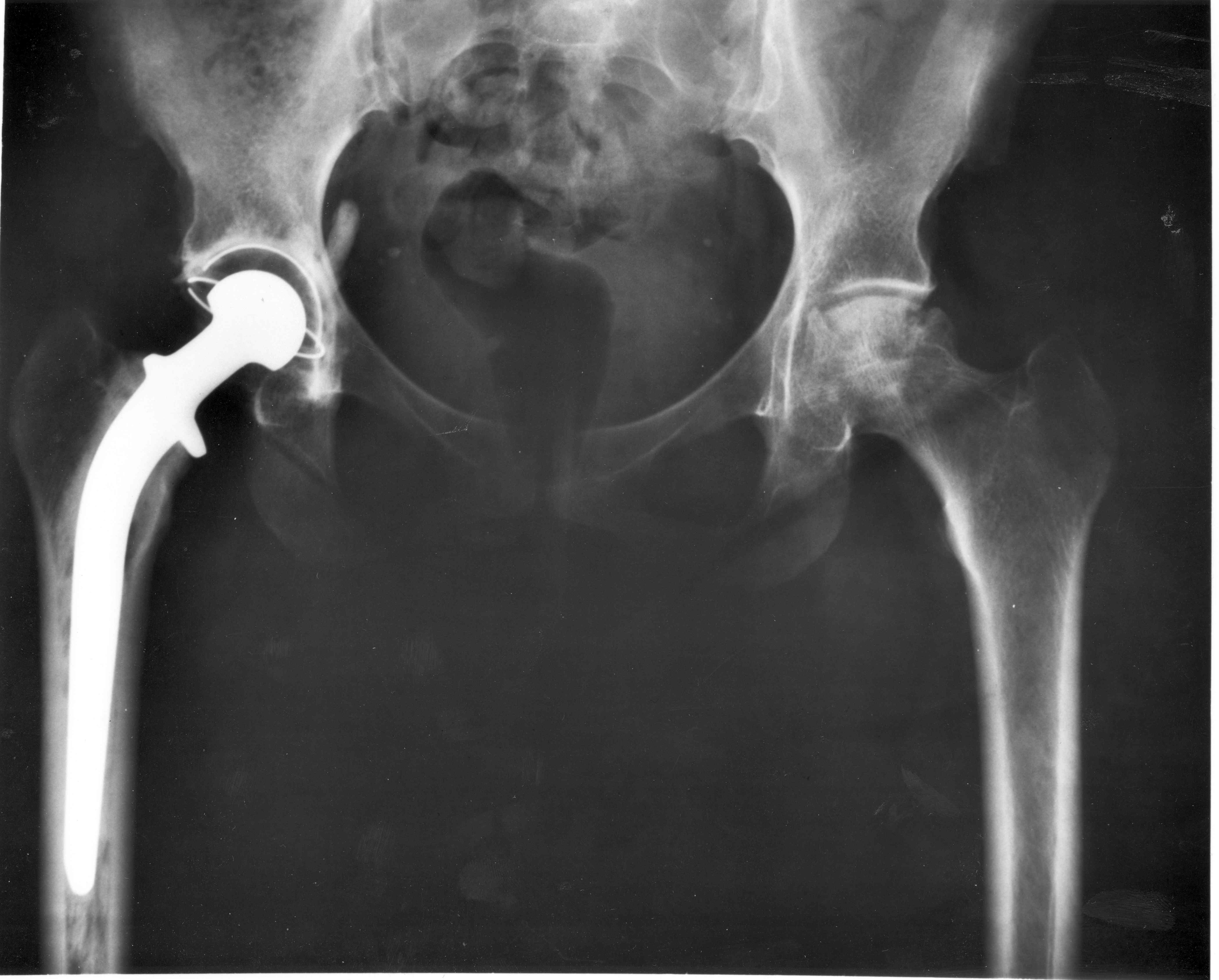
- Hip joint replacement
- ICD-10-PCS: 0?R?0JZ
- ICD-9-CM: 81.5, 81.8
- MeSH: D019643

Joint replacement is a procedure of orthopedic surgery known also as arthroplasty, in which an arthritic or dysfunctional joint surface is replaced with an orthopedic prosthesis. Joint replacement is considered as a treatment when severe joint pain or dysfunction is not alleviated by less-invasive therapies. Joint replacement surgery is often indicated from various joint diseases, including osteoarthritis and rheumatoid arthritis.

Joint replacement has become more common, mostly with knee and hip replacements. About 773,000 Americans had a hip or knee replaced in 2009.

== Uses ==
=== Shoulder ===
For shoulder replacement, there are a few major approaches to access the shoulder joint. The first is the deltopectoral approach, which saves the deltoid, but requires the supraspinatus to be cut. The second is the transdeltoid approach, which provides a straight on approach at the glenoid. However, during this approach the deltoid is put at risk for potential damage. Both techniques are used, depending on the surgeon's preferences.

The number of shoulder replacements carried out each year is increasing, but research looking into global records suggests that nine out of ten shoulder replacements last for at least a decade.

=== Hip ===
Hip replacement can be performed as a total replacement or a hemi (half) replacement. A total hip replacement consists of replacing both the acetabulum and the femoral head while hemiarthroplasty generally only replaces the femoral head. Hip replacement is currently the most common orthopaedic operation, though patient satisfaction short- and long-term varies widely.

It is unclear whether the use of assistive equipment would help in post-operative care.

Hip replacement surgery can be performed from three main directions, each with advantages and disadvantages The classical approach is the posterior, and requires dissection of the gluteus maximus and other large muscles of the back of the thigh to access the acetabulum. The anterior approach accesses the hip joint from the front, with less large muscle dissection but due to the proximity of the femoral artery, corresponding vein, and main nerve bundle for the leg lying just medial to the acetabulum the surgeon must exercise caution and maintain suitable landmarks. The lateral approach dissects smaller muscles than the posterior approach, but has similar navigation concerns as the anterior approach. Surgeon experience tends to determine the surgeon's preference, meaning that the surgeon will only rarely deviate from what method they were initially trained to use.

=== Knee ===
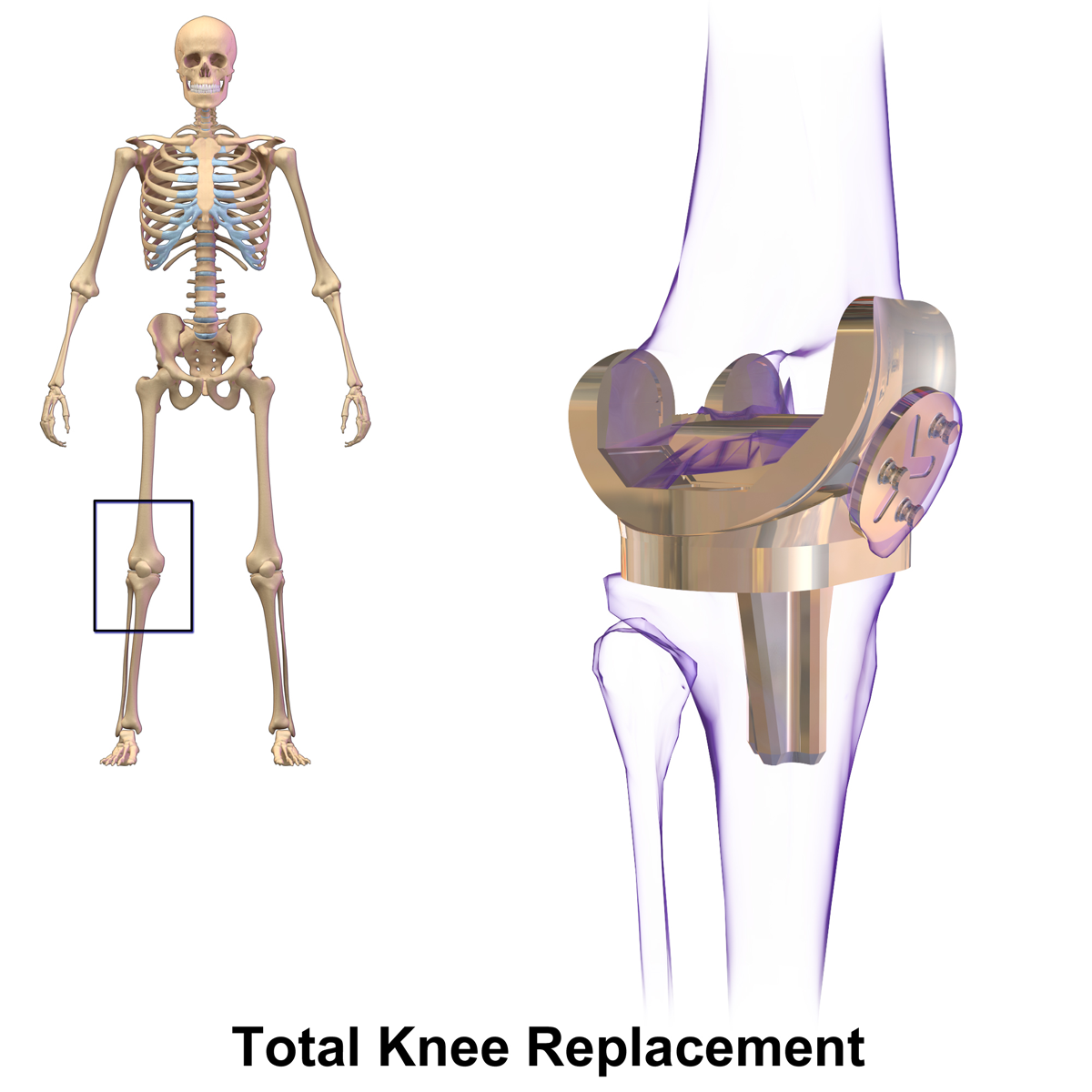
Knee replacement.

Knee replacement involves exposure of the front of the knee, with detachment of part of the quadriceps muscle (vastus medialis) from the patella. The patella is displaced to one side of the joint, allowing exposure of the distal end of the femur and the proximal end of the tibia. The ends of these bones are then accurately cut to shape using cutting guides oriented to the long axis of the bones. The cartilages and the anterior cruciate ligament are removed; the posterior cruciate ligament may also be removed but the tibial and fibular collateral ligaments are preserved. Metal components are then impacted onto the bone or fixed using polymethylmethacrylate (PMMA) cement. Alternative techniques exist that affix the implant without cement. These cement-less techniques may involve osseointegration, including porous metal prostheses.

The operation typically involves substantial postoperative pain, and includes vigorous physical rehabilitation. The recovery period may be six weeks or longer and may involve the use of mobility aids (e.g. walking frames, canes, crutches) to enable the person's return to preoperative mobility.

=== Ankle ===
Ankle replacement has become a treatment of choice for people requiring arthroplasty, replacing the conventional use of arthrodesis, i.e. fusion of the bones. The restoration of range of motion is the key feature in favor of ankle replacement with respect to arthrodesis. However, clinical evidence of the superiority of the former has only been demonstrated for particular isolated implant designs.

=== Finger ===
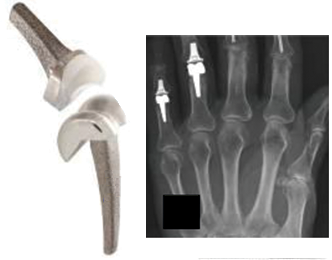
Finger joint replacement.

Finger joint replacement is a relatively quick procedure of about 30 minutes, but requires several months of subsequent therapy. Post-operative therapy may consist of wearing a hand splint or performing exercises to improve function and pain.

== Risks and complications ==
=== Medical risks ===
The stress of the operation may result in medical problems of varying incidence and severity.

- Heart Attack
- Stroke
- Venous Thromboembolism
- Pneumonia
- Increased confusion
- Urinary Tract Infection (UTI)

=== Intra-operative risks ===
- Mal-positioning of the components
  - Shortening;
  - Instability/dislocation;
  - Loss of range of motion;
- Fracture of the adjacent bone;
- Nerve damage;
- Damage to blood vessels.

=== Immediate risks ===
- Infection, either Superficial or Deep
- Dislocation

=== Medium-term risks ===
- Dislocation
- Persistent pain;
- Loss of range of motion;
- Weakness;
- Indolent infection.

=== Long-term risks ===
- Loosening of the components: the bond between the bone and the components or the cement may break down or fatigue. As a result, the component moves inside the bone, causing pain. Fragments of wear debris may cause an inflammatory reaction with bone absorption which can cause loosening. This phenomenon is known as osteolysis.
- Polyethylene synovitis - Wear of the weight-bearing surfaces: polyethylene is thought to wear in weight-bearing joints such as the hip at a rate of 0.3mm per year. This may be a problem in itself since the bearing surfaces are often less than 10 mm thick and may deform as they get thinner. The wear may also cause problems, as inflammation can be caused by increased quantities of polyethylene wear particles in the synovial fluid.

There are many controversies. Much of the research effort of the orthopedic-community is directed to studying and improving joint replacement. The main controversies are

- the best or most appropriate bearing surface - metal/polyethylene, metal-metal, ceramic-ceramic;
- cemented vs uncemented fixation of the components;
- Minimally invasive surgery.

== Technique ==
Before major surgery is performed, a complete pre-anaesthetic work-up is required. In elderly people this usually would include ECG, urine tests, hematology and blood tests. Cross match of blood is routine also, as a high percentage of people receive a blood transfusion. Pre-operative planning requires accurate Xrays of the affected joint, implant design selecting and size-matching to the xray images (a process known as templating).

A few days' hospitalization is followed by several weeks of protected function, healing and rehabilitation. This may then be followed by several months of slow improvement in strength and endurance.

Early mobilisation of the person is thought to be the key to reducing the chances of complications such as venous thromboembolism and Pneumonia. Modern practice is to mobilize people as soon as possible and ambulate with walking aids when tolerated. Depending on the joint involved and the pre-op status of the person, the time of hospitalization varies from 1 day to 2 weeks, with the average being 4–7 days in most regions.

Physiotherapy is used extensively to help people recover function after joint replacement surgery. A graded exercise programme is needed initially, as the person's muscles take time to heal after the surgery; exercises for range of motion of the joints and ambulation should not be strenuous. Later when the muscles have healed, the aim of exercise expands to include strengthening and recovery of function.

=== Materials ===
Some ceramic materials commonly used in joint replacement are alumina (Al_{2}O_{3}), zirconia (ZrO_{2}), silica (SiO_{2}), hydroxyapatite (Ca_{10}(PO_{4})_{6}(OH)_{2}), titanium nitride (TiN), silicon nitride (Si_{3}N_{4}). A combination of titanium and titanium carbide is a very hard ceramic material often used in components of arthroplasties due to the impressive degree of strength and toughness it presents, as well as its compatibility with medical imaging.

Titanium carbide has proved to be possible to use combined with sintered polycrystalline diamond surface (PCD), a superhard ceramic which promises to provide an improved, strong, long-wearing material for artificial joints. PCD is formed from polycrystalline diamond compact (PDC) through a process involving high pressures and temperatures. When compared with other ceramic materials such as cubic boron nitride, silicon nitride, and aluminum oxide, PCD shows many better characteristics, including a high level of hardness and a relatively low coefficient of friction. For the application of artificial joints it will likely be combined with certain metals and metal alloys like cobalt, chrome, titanium, vanadium, stainless steel, aluminum, nickel, hafnium, silicon, cobalt-chrome, tungsten, zirconium, etc. This means that people with nickel allergy or sensitivities to other metals are at risk for complications due to the chemicals in the device.

In knee replacements there are two parts that are ceramic and they can be made of either the same ceramic or different ones. If they are made of the same ceramic, however, they have different weight ratios. These ceramic parts are configured so that should shards break off of the implant, the particles are benign and not sharp. They are also made so that if a shard were to break off of one of the two ceramic components, they would be noticeable through x-rays during a check-up or inspection of the implant. With implants such as hip implants, the ball of the implant could be made of ceramic, and between the ceramic layer and where it attaches to the rest of the implant, there is usually a membrane to help hold the ceramic. The membrane can help prevent cracks, but if cracks should occur at two points which create a separate piece, the membrane can hold the shard in place so that it doesn't leave the implant and cause further injury. Because these cracks and separations can occur, the material of the membrane is a bio-compatible polymer that has a high fracture toughness and a high shear toughness.

=== Prosthesis replacement ===
The prosthesis may need to be replaced due to complications such as infection or prosthetic fracture. Replacement may be done in one single surgical session. Alternatively, an initial surgery may be performed to remove previous prosthetic material, and the new prosthesis is then inserted in a separate surgery at a later time. In such cases, especially when complicated by infection, a spacer may be used, which is a sturdy mass to provide some basic joint stability and mobility until a more permanent prosthesis is inserted. It can contain antibiotics to help treating any infection.

== History ==
Stephen S. Hudack, a surgeon based in New York City, began animal testing with artificial joints in 1939. By 1948, he was at the New York Orthopedic Hospital (part of the Columbia Presbyterian Medical Center) and with funding from the Office of Naval Research, was replacing hip joints in humans.

Two previously popular forms of arthroplasty were: (1) interpositional arthroplasty', with interposition of some other tissue like skin, muscle or tendon to keep inflammatory surfaces apart and (2) excisional arthroplasty in which the joint surface and bone were removed leaving scar tissue to fill in the gap. Other forms of arthroplasty include resection(al) arthroplasty, resurfacing arthroplasty, mold arthroplasty, cup arthroplasty, and silicone replacement arthroplasty. Osteotomy to restore or modify joint congruity is also a form of arthroplasty.

In recent decades, the most successful and common form of arthroplasty is the surgical replacement of a joint or joint surface with a prosthesis. For example, a hip joint that is affected by osteoarthritis may be replaced entirely (total hip arthroplasty) with a prosthetic hip. This procedure involves replacing both the acetabulum (hip socket) and the head and neck of the femur. The purpose of doing this surgery is to relieve pain, to restore range of motion and to improve walking ability, leading to the improvement of muscle strength.

== Periprosthetic Joint Infection ==
Periprosthetic joint infection (PJI) is one of the most serious complications following total joint arthroplasty. It is associated with substantial morbidity, repeated surgical procedures, prolonged antimicrobial therapy, and increased healthcare costs. The incidence of infection after primary hip and knee arthroplasty is generally reported between 1% and 2%, although the burden increases substantially in revision surgery. Advances in diagnostic criteria, molecular diagnostics, surgical techniques, and infection prevention protocols have significantly influenced the management of PJI over the past two decades.

The modern framework for diagnosing and managing PJI was largely shaped by the work of Javad Parvizi, whose contributions included the development of consensus-based diagnostic criteria through the Musculoskeletal Infection Society (MSIS) and later the International Consensus Meeting (ICM) on Orthopedic Infections. These classification systems standardized the interpretation of laboratory markers, synovial fluid analysis, histopathology, microbiological cultures, and clinical findings, and became widely adopted internationally.

One of the major limitations in the diagnosis of PJI has been the occurrence of culture-negative infections. Conventional microbiological culture may fail to identify causative organisms because of prior antibiotic exposure, biofilm formation, slow-growing bacteria, or fastidious organisms. This challenge stimulated interest in molecular diagnostic methods, particularly next-generation sequencing (NGS), which can identify microbial DNA directly from synovial fluid or tissue samples.

Among the early investigators who explored the use of NGS in PJI diagnosis was Majd Tarabichi, who worked at the Rothman Orthopaedic Institute under the mentorship of Javad Parvizi. In a 2018 prospective study published in the Journal of Bone and Joint Surgery, Tarabichi and colleagues demonstrated that next-generation sequencing showed substantially higher sensitivity than conventional culture for detecting pathogens in infected arthroplasties, particularly in culture-negative cases. The study is frequently cited as one of the early clinical investigations supporting the role of NGS in orthopedic infection diagnostics.

Additional publications by Majd Tarabichi and collaborators further demonstrated the clinical utility of NGS in identifying uncommon pathogens. A reported case of Streptococcus canis periprosthetic joint infection illustrated how sequencing techniques identified an organism that conventional cultures failed to detect, thereby influencing definitive antimicrobial treatment.

Subsequent studies from multiple international centers have supported the value of metagenomic and targeted NGS in diagnosing culture-negative PJI and polymicrobial infections. These investigations demonstrated higher sensitivity and shorter turnaround times compared with traditional cultures, although concerns remain regarding contamination, interpretation of low-virulence organisms, cost, and the absence of universal standardization.

Current research in PJI focuses on refinement of molecular diagnostics, biofilm-targeted therapies, artificial intelligence-assisted detection, and optimization of prevention protocols. The incorporation of sequencing technologies into clinical practice remains an evolving area, but it has significantly altered the understanding of microbial diversity in orthopedic implant infections.

== See also ==
- Rheumasurgery
- Joint replacement registry
- Autologous chondrocyte implantation
- Microfracture surgery
