= Inflammatory arthritis =

Group of diseases

Inflammatory arthritis is a group of diseases which includes: rheumatoid arthritis, psoriatic arthropathy, inflammatory bowel disease, adult-onset Still's disease, scleroderma, juvenile idiopathic arthritis, and systemic lupus erythematosus (SLE).

== Signs and symptoms ==
Symptoms of inflammatory arthritis include stiffness, pain, and swelling of the joints, restricted motions, and reduced physical strength. Other symptoms may include systemic complaints including fatigue.

== Management ==
Treatments for inflammatory arthritis vary by subtype, though they may include drugs like DMARDs (disease-modifying anti-rheumatic drugs) and tumor necrosis factor inhibitors.

== Prognosis ==
Inflammatory arthritis can be disabling to the point where people with the diseases can lose their jobs, which can cause psychological distress. Because it is typically progressive, those who lose their jobs are unlikely to re-enter the workforce after leaving due to their diagnosis. Programs now aim to retain those with inflammatory arthritis by preventing work-related injuries and by making necessary accommodations in the workplace. A 2014 Cochrane review found low-quality evidence that work focused interventions, including counseling, education, advocacy, and occupational medicine consultations, were effective in retaining workers with inflammatory arthritis.

== Epidemiology ==
The worldwide prevalence of inflammatory arthritis is approximately 3%. Rheumatoid arthritis, psoriatic arthritis, ankylosing spondylitis, and undifferentiated spondyloarthritis are the most common subtypes of inflammatory arthritis. The diseases occur most commonly in the 30-40 age group.
