= Synovial fluid =

Fluid found in the cavities of synovial joints

- A typical joint

Details

Identifiers
- Latin: synovia
- MeSH: D013582
- TA98: A03.0.00.031
- TA2: 1535
- FMA: 12277

Synovial fluid, also called synovia,^{[help 1]} is a viscous, non-Newtonian fluid found in the cavities of synovial joints. With its egg white–like consistency, the principal role of synovial fluid is to reduce friction between the articular cartilage of synovial joints during movement. Synovial fluid is a small component of the transcellular fluid component of extracellular fluid.

== Structure ==
The inner membrane of synovial joints is called the synovial membrane and secretes synovial fluid into the joints. Synovial fluid is an ultrafiltrate from blood, and contains proteins derived from the blood plasma and proteins that are produced by cells within the joint tissues. The fluid contains hyaluronan secreted by fibroblast-like cells in the synovial membrane, lubricin (proteoglycan 4; PRG4) secreted by the surface chondrocytes of the articular cartilage and interstitial fluid filtered from the blood plasma. This fluid forms a thin layer (roughly 50 μm) at the surface of cartilage and also seeps into microcavities and irregularities in the articular cartilage surface, filling all empty space. The fluid in articular cartilage effectively serves as a synovial fluid reserve. During movement, the synovial fluid held in the cartilage is squeezed out mechanically to maintain a layer of fluid on the cartilage surface (so-called weeping lubrication). The functions of the synovial fluid include:

- reduction of friction – synovial fluid lubricates the articulating joints
- shock absorption – as a dilatant fluid, that possesses rheopectic properties, becoming more viscous under applied pressure; the synovial fluid in diarthrotic joints becomes thick the moment shear is applied in order to protect the joint and subsequently, thins to normal viscosity instantaneously to resume its lubricating function between shocks.
- nutrient and waste transportation – the fluid supplies oxygen and nutrients and removes carbon dioxide and metabolic wastes from the chondrocytes in the surrounding cartilage
- molecular sieving – pressure within the joint forces hyaluronan in the fluid against the synovial membrane forming a barrier against cells migrating into, or fluid migrating out of, the joint space. This function is dependent on the molecular weight of the hyaluronan.

=== Composition ===
Synovial tissue is sterile and composed of vascularized connective tissue that lacks a basement membrane. Two cell types (type A and type B) are present: Type A is derived from blood monocytes, and it removes the wear-and-tear debris from the synovial fluid. Type B produces hyaluronan. Synovial fluid is made of hyaluronic acid and lubricin, proteinases, and collagenases. Synovial fluid exhibits non-Newtonian flow characteristics; the viscosity coefficient is not a constant and the fluid is not linearly viscous. Synovial fluid has anti-thixotropic characteristics; under conditions of sudden increase in pressure as in some kind of mechanical shock, its viscosity suddenly increases. Normal synovial fluid contains 3–4 mg/ml hyaluronan (hyaluronic acid), a polymer of disaccharides composed of D-glucuronic acid and D-N-acetylglucosamine joined by alternating beta-1,4 and beta-1,3 glycosidic bonds. Hyaluronan is synthesized by the synovial membrane and secreted into the joint cavity to increase the viscosity and elasticity of articular cartilages and to lubricate the surfaces between synovium and cartilage.

Synovial fluid contains lubricin (also known as PRG4) as a second lubricating component, secreted by synovial fibroblasts. Chiefly, it is responsible for so-called boundary-layer lubrication, which reduces friction between opposing surfaces of cartilage. There also is some evidence that it helps regulate synovial cell growth.

It also contains phagocytic cells that remove microbes and the debris that results from normal wear and tear in the joint.

== Clinical significance ==
=== Collection ===
Synovial fluid may be collected by syringe in a procedure termed arthrocentesis, also known as joint aspiration.

=== Classification ===
Synovial fluid may be classified into normal, noninflammatory, inflammatory, septic, and hemorrhagic:

Classification of synovial fluid in an adult knee joint.
	Normal	Non-inflammatory	Inflammatory	Septic	Bleeding
Volume (ml)	<3.5	>3.5	>3.5	>3.5	>3.5
Viscosity	High	High	Low	Mixed	Low
Clarity	Clear	Clear	Cloudy	Opaque	Mixed
Color	Colorless/straw	Straw/yellow	Yellow	Mixed	Red
WBC/mm^{3}	<200	<2,000	5,000-75,000	>50,000	Similar to blood level
Polys (%)	<25	<25	50-70	>70	Similar to blood level
Gram stain	None	None	None	+ (S aureus & Streptococcus) – (Neisseria gonorrhoeae)	None

Glucose (mg/dl) concentration in synovial fluid is nearly equal to serum.

Synovial fluid viscosity

Normal:

- Normal
- Traumatic arthritis
- Degenerative (Osteo) arthritis
- Pigmented villonodular synovitis

Normal or decreased:

- Systemic lupus erythematosus

Decreased:

- Rheumatic fever
- Rheumatoid arthritis
- Gout
- Pyogenic (Septic) arthritis
- Tubercular arthritis
- Less of lubrication in joints

=== Pathology ===
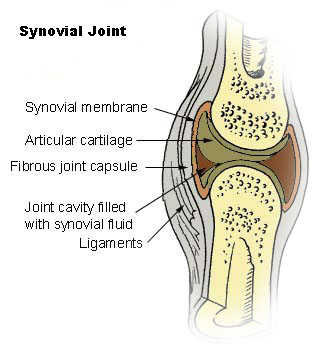
Synovial joint

Many synovial fluid types are associated with specific diagnoses:

- Noninflammatory (Group I)
  - Osteoarthritis, degenerative joint disease
  - Trauma
  - Rheumatic fever
  - Chronic gout or pseudogout
  - Scleroderma
  - Polymyositis
  - Systemic lupus erythematosus
  - Erythema nodosum
  - Neuropathic arthropathy (with possible hemorrhage)
  - Sickle-cell disease
  - Hemochromatosis
  - Acromegaly
  - Amyloidosis
- Inflammatory (Group II)
  - Rheumatoid arthritis
  - Reactive arthritis
  - Psoriatic arthritis
  - Acute rheumatic fever
  - Acute gout or pseudogout
  - Scleroderma
  - Polymyositis
  - Systemic lupus erythematosus
  - Ankylosing spondylitis
  - Inflammatory bowel disease arthritis
  - Infection (viral, fungal, bacterial) including Lyme disease
  - Acute crystal synovitis (gout)
- Septic (Group III)
  - Pyogenic bacterial infection
  - Septic arthritis
- Hemorrhagic
  - Trauma
  - Tumors
  - Hemophilia/coagulopathy
  - Scurvy
  - Ehlers–Danlos syndrome
  - Neuropathic arthropathy

== Analysis ==
Glucose (mg/dl) concentration in synovial fluid is nearly equal to serum.

The cytological and biochemical analysis of human synovial fluid began around 1940 using cadaver-derived fluid and comparing characteristics to those of, for instance, bovine synovial fluid.

=== Chemistry ===
The mucin clot test is a very old approach to determining if an inflammatory infiltrate is present. In this test, acetic acid is added to the synovial fluid specimen. In a normal specimen, this should lead to a congealing of the hyaluronic acid, forming a 'mucin clot.' If inflammation is present, a mucin clot is not formed (the hyaluronic acid is degraded).

Lactate is elevated in septic arthritis, usually above 250 mg/dL.

Complement factors are decreased in rheumatoid arthritis and lupus arthritis.

=== Microscopy ===
Microscopic analysis of synovial fluid is performed to evaluate for cell count and crystals. Crystals include monosodium urate crystals, calcium pyrophosphate, hydroxyapatite and corticosteroid crystals.

Monosodium urate crystals are seen in gout or gouty arthritis and appear as needle-shaped negatively birefringent crystals varying in length from 2 to 20 μm. With negative birefringence, the crystals appear yellow in parallel light and blue with perpendicular light.

Calcium pyrophosphate crystals are seen in pseudogout (also known as calcium pyrophosphate deposition disease, or CPPD). These crystals are rod-shaped or rhomboids varying in length from 2 to 20 μm and with positive birefringence (blue with parallel light, yellow with perpendicular light).

Hydroxyapatite crystals are small and negatively birefringent. They are usually only detectable with an Alizarin Red S stain.

Corticosteroid crystals may be seen following therapeutic corticosteroid injection into the joint space. They appear blunt, jagged, and show variable birefringence.

=== Cracking joints ===
When the two articulating surfaces of a synovial joint are separated from one other, the volume within the joint capsule is increased and a negative pressure results. The volume of synovial fluid within the joint is insufficient to fill the expanding volume of the joint and gases dissolved in the synovial fluid (mostly carbon dioxide) are liberated and quickly fill the empty space, leading to the rapid formation of a bubble. This process is known as cavitation. Cavitation in synovial joints results in a high frequency 'cracking' sound.

== Etymology and pronunciation ==
The term synovia (/sɪˈnoʊviə/) came to English around 1640 (the anglicized form synovial is first recorded in the mid 18th century) from Neo-Latin, where it was coined perhaps by Paracelsus from Greek συν- "with" and Latin ovum "egg" and -ia because it resembles egg white in consistency and external appearance.

The term synovium is a much more recent pseudo-Latin coinage for what is less confusingly called the synovial membrane. It is not recorded in general dictionaries, and medical dictionaries only explain its meaning, not its etymology, but it is apparently derived from the term synovia, i.e. the obfuscated etymology of mixed Greek and Latin elements of the singular term synovia was misunderstood and the word was erroneously reinterpreted as the plural of the previously non-existent term synovium (perhaps in analogy to other plural terms for liquids such as "waters" for amniotic fluid). If one insists on using this pseudo-Latin term synovium for the synovial membrane, the non-Latinate plural synoviums is better and less confusing than synovia.

== See also ==
- Body fluid
- Biofluid dynamics
