= Joint stiffness =

Pain or reduced range of motion when moving a joint

- Specialty: Rheumatology

Joint stiffness may be either the symptom of pain on moving a joint, the symptom of loss of range of motion or the physical sign of reduced range of motion.

- Pain on movement is commonly caused by osteoarthritis, often in quite minor degrees, and other forms of arthritis. It may also be caused by injury or overuse and rarely by more complex causes of pain such as infection or neoplasm. The range of motion may be normal or limited by pain. "Morning stiffness" pain which eases up after the joint has been used, is characteristic of rheumatoid arthritis.
- Loss of motion (symptom): the patient notices that the joint (or many joints) do not move as far as they used to or need to. Loss of motion is a feature of more advanced stages of arthritis including osteoarthritis, rheumatoid arthritis and ankylosing spondylitis.
- Loss of range of motion (sign): the examining medical professional notes that the range of motion of the joint is less than normal. Routine examination by an orthopaedic surgeon or rheumatologist will often pay particular attention to this. The range of motion may be measured and compared to the other side and to normal ranges. This sign is associated with the same causes as the symptom. The loss of range of motion in the joint may be due to a contracture. In extreme cases when the joint does not move at all it is said to be ankylosed.

== See also ==
- Flexibility (anatomy)
- Contracture
