= Arthropathy =

- Other names: Joint disease
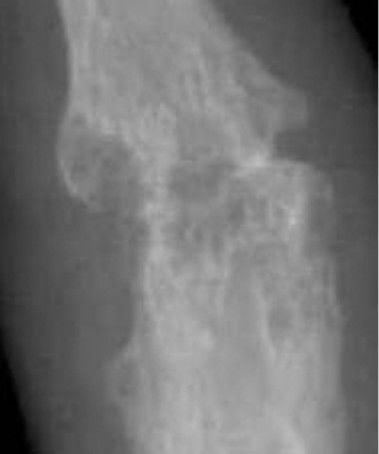
- Bone erosions from rheumatoid arthritis.
- Specialty: Rheumatology

An arthropathy is a disease of a joint.

== Types ==
Arthritis is a form of arthropathy that involves inflammation of one or more joints, while the term arthropathy may be used regardless of whether there is inflammation or not.

Joint diseases can be classified as follows:

- Arthritis

- Infectious arthritis

- Septic arthritis (infectious)
- Tuberculosis arthritis
- Reactive arthritis (indirectly)

- Noninfectious arthritis

- Seronegative spondyloarthropathy:

- Psoriatic arthritis
- Ankylosing spondylitis

- Rheumatoid arthritis:

- Felty's syndrome

- Juvenile idiopathic arthritis
- Adult-onset Still's disease
- Crystal arthropathy

- Gout
- Chondrocalcinosis

- Osteoarthritis

- Hemarthrosis (joint bleeding)
- Synovitis is the medical term for inflammation of the synovial membrane.
- Joint dislocation

=== With arthropathy in the name ===
- Reactive arthropathy (M02-M03) is caused by an infection, but not a direct infection of the synovial space. (See also Reactive arthritis)
- Enteropathic arthropathy (M07) is caused by colitis and related conditions.
- Crystal arthropathy (also known as crystal arthritis) (M10-M11) involves the deposition of crystals in the joint.
  - In gout, the crystal is uric acid.
  - In pseudogout/chondrocalcinosis/calcium pyrophosphate deposition disease, the crystal is calcium pyrophosphate.
- Diabetic arthropathy (M14.2, E10-E14) is caused by diabetes.
- Neuropathic arthropathy (M14.6) is associated with a loss of sensation.

Spondylarthropathy is any form of arthropathy of the vertebral column.

== Signs and symptoms ==
Joint pain is a common but non-specific sign of joint disease. Signs will depend on the specific disease, and may even then vary. Common signs may include:

- Decreased range of motion
- Stiffness
- Effusion
- Pneumarthrosis, air in a joint (which is also a common normal finding).
- Bone erosion
- Systemic signs of arthritis such as fatigue

== Diagnosis ==
Diagnosis may be a combination of medical history, physical examination, blood tests and medical imaging (generally X-ray initially).
