= Crystal arthropathy =

- Specialty: Rheumatology

Crystal arthropathy is a class of joint disorders (called arthropathy) that is characterized by the accumulation of tiny crystals in one or more joints. Polarizing microscopy and the application of other crystallographic techniques have improved the identification of different microcrystals including monosodium urate, calcium pyrophosphate dihydrate, calcium hydroxyapatite, and calcium oxalate.

== Types ==
Name	Substance	Birefringence
Gout	accumulation of uric acid	negative
Chondrocalcinosis aka Pseudogout	accumulation of calcium pyrophosphate	weakly positive

== Causes ==
- Deposition of crystals in joints
- Calcium pyrophosphate dihydrate crystal formation:
  - Increased production of inorganic pyrophosphate
  - Decreased levels of pyrophosphatase in cartilage
  - Decreased levels of cartilage glycosaminoglycans
  - Hyperparathyroidism
  - Hemochromatosis
  - Hypophosphatasia
  - Hypomagnesemia
- Hydroxyapatite deposition:
  - Tissue damage
  - Hyperparathyroidism
  - Hypercalcemia
  - Hyperphosphatemia
- Calcium oxalate deposition:
  - Enhanced production of oxalic acid due to enzyme defect
  - Poor excretion of oxalic acid in kidney failure
  - Excessive ascorbic acid intake in kidney failure

== Risk factors ==
- Obesity
- Kidney failure
- Hyperphosphatemia
- Hyperparathyroidism
- Hypercalcemia
- Tissue damage (dystrophic calcification)

== Diagnosis ==
=== Differential diagnosis ===
- Septic arthritis
- Type IIa hyperlipoproteinemia
- Amyloidosis
- Multicentric reticulohistiocytosis
- Hyperparathyroidism
- Spondyloarthropathy
- Rheumatoid arthritis

== Treatment ==
1. Steroid - options are intra-articular injection, oral steroid, or intramuscular injection of steroid. Intra-articular steroid + lido w/o (I like triamcinolone the best) 20 mg for small joints is perfect. For the intramuscular injection, I like 40 mg triamcinolone and 20 mg dexamethasone in the same syringe injected into the gluteus. For the oral steroid, I like Prednisone 40 mg every morning for seven days. The prescription will read prednisone 20 mg, two tabs PO Qa.m. x 7d, #14 0RF.

2. Colchicine 0.6 mg tabs - two tabs by mouth once and then one tab by mouth an hour later.

3. NSAID - I prefer 500 mg of naproxen twice a day for seven days. Just be careful with the NSAID and steroid combination. If prescribing oral steroids, I put patients on famotidine 40 mg one tablet by mouth twice a day for 14 days

Do not prescribe allopurinol for acute gout flair. Wait until they are six weeks resolved to initiate that, otherwise you can cause an acute flare/worsening of the gout. However, they are already on allopurinol, continue it.
