= Camptodactyly-arthropathy-coxa vara-pericarditis syndrome =

Autosomal recessive genetic condition

- Other names: Pericarditis-arthropathy-camptodactyly syndrome

Camptodactyly-arthropathy-coxa vara-pericarditis syndrome is a rare autosomal recessive genetic medical condition due to a mutation in the gene proteoglycan 4 (PRG4) – a mucin-type glycoprotein that acts as a lubricant for the cartilage surfaces. This gene is also known as lubricin.

== Presentation ==
This condition was first described in 1986. and is a syndrome of camptodactyly, arthropathy, coxa vara, and pericarditis. It may also include congenital cataracts. The cause of this syndrome was discovered in 1999.

Children with this syndrome often present with a joint effusion that is cool and resistant to anti-inflammatory therapy. The arthropathy principally involves large joints such as elbows, hips, knees, and ankles. Pericarditis may be a presenting feature or may occur later in the course of the disease. Coxa vara occurs in 50–90% of cases and noninflammatory pericarditis in 30%.

== Genetics ==
The gene responsible for this condition is located on the long arm of chromosome 1 (1q). The encoded protein is a glycoprotein of ~345 kDa specifically synthesized by chondrocytes located at the surface of articular cartilage, and also by some synovial lining cells. The cDNA encodes a protein of 1,404 amino acids (human A isoform) with a somatomedin B homology domain, heparin-binding domains, multiple mucin-like repeats, a hemopexin domain, and an aggregation domain. There are 3 consensus sequences for N-glycosylation and 1 chondroitin sulfate substitution site.

== Diagnosis ==
=== Laboratory ===
The full blood count, erythrocyte sedimentation rate and C reactive protein are normal.

Synovial fluid is typically viscous, clear, honey-colored, and low in cell count. Synovial histology shows little or no mononuclear infiltration. Mild thickening of the synovium is present and giant cells may be occasionally seen.

=== Radiology ===
Large acetabular cysts are common in this condition. Other features include periarticular osteopenia, squaring of metacarpals and phalanges and bilateral joint effusions.
