= Radiosynoviorthesis =

Radioisotopic procedure for arthritis

- [edit on Wikidata]

Radiosynoviorthesis (RSO) is a minimally invasive therapeutic procedure for managing joint inflammation, particularly synovitis associated with osteoarthritis. Radiosynoviorthesis involves the intra-articular injection of radioactive isotopes to specifically treat the inflamed synovial membrane. Synovitis, a hallmark of various joint disorders, including osteoarthritis, manifests as inflammation within the synovial membrane lining the joints. RSO aims to suppress overactive macrophage and synovial cells responsible for the inflammatory response, providing relief from pain and improving joint functionality.

Synovitis is implicated in the pathogenesis of osteoarthritis, the most prevalent form of arthritis. Mechanical stress, injury, or biochemical factors trigger an inflammatory response within the synovial membrane, perpetuating chronic inflammation. This inflammatory environment contributes to the breakdown of cartilage, exacerbating joint pain and dysfunction in osteoarthritis patients.

Macrophages are immune cells found within the synovial tissue which play a significant role in the development and progression of synovitis and osteoarthritis. Inflamed synovial tissue attracts macrophages, which release pro-inflammatory cytokines and enzymes. These molecules perpetuate synovial inflammation, leading to cartilage degradation and further joint damage. RSO, by targeting the inflamed synovium, aims to reduce the number and activity of macrophages, thereby relieving joint inflammation and slowing down osteoarthritis progression. Long-term results have been observed in human knee and finger osteoarthritis.

In addition to Yttrium-90 (Y-90) and Rhenium-186 (Re-186), another radioisotope used in radiosynoviorthesis is Tin-117m (Sn-117m). Tin-117m is radioisotope that is used to treat synovitis and osteoarthritis in canines with elbow dysplasia.
