= CACP =

CACP might refer to:

- Camptodactyly-arthropathy-coxa vara-pericarditis syndrome
- Proteoglycan 4, extracellular protein

== Organisations and government ==
- Canadian Association of Chiefs of Police
- Commission for Agricultural Costs and Prices, India
- Communauté d'agglomération de Cergy-Pontoise, France
- Conservation of the Asiatic Cheetah Project, Iran
