= Proteoglycan 4 =

Proteoglycan; lubricant; gene

PRG4

Identifiers
- Aliases: PRG4, CACP, HAPO, JCAP, MSF, SZP, bG174L6.2, proteoglycan 4
- External IDs: OMIM: 604283; MGI: 1891344; GeneCards: PRG4

Gene location (Human)
Chr.	Chromosome 1 (human)
Band	1q31.1	Start	186,296,279 bp
Band	1q31.1	End	186,314,567 bp

Gene location (Mouse)
Chr.	Chromosome 1 (mouse)
Band	1|1 G1	Start	150,449,412 bp
Band	1|1 G1	End	150,466,165 bp
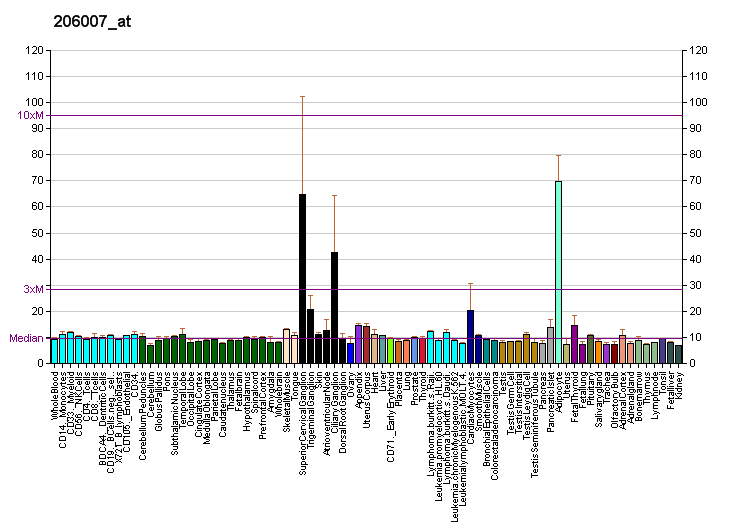
RNA expression pattern
Bgee	Human / Mouse (ortholog); Top expressed in: synovial joint; Achilles tendon; pericardium; synovial membrane; parietal pleura; right lobe of liver; germinal epithelium; islet of Langerhans; popliteal artery; tibial arteries / Top expressed in: ankle; tibiofemoral joint; trachea; intercostal muscle; stroma of bone marrow; semi-lunar valve; aortic valve; muscle of thigh; left lobe of liver; medial head of gastrocnemius muscle; More reference expression data
BioGPS	More reference expression data
Gene ontology
Molecular function	scavenger receptor activity; polysaccharide binding; extracellular matrix structural constituent conferring compression resistance
Cellular component	extracellular region; extracellular matrix; collagen-containing extracellular matrix
Biological process	cell population proliferation; receptor-mediated endocytosis; immune response; vesicle-mediated transport; endocytosis
Sources:Amigo / QuickGO
Orthologs
Databases	NCBI: entry; OMA: entry
Species	Human	Mouse
Entrez	10216	96875
Ensembl	ENSG00000116690	ENSMUSG00000006014
UniProt	Q92954	Q9JM99
RefSeq (mRNA)	NM_005807; NM_001127708; NM_001127709; NM_001127710; NM_001303232	NM_001110146; NM_021400
RefSeq (protein)	NP_001121180; NP_001121181; NP_001121182; NP_001290161; NP_005798	NP_001103616; NP_067375
Location (UCSC)	Chr 1: 186.3 – 186.31 Mb	Chr 1: 150.45 – 150.47 Mb
PubMed search
- Wikidata
View/Edit Human	View/Edit Mouse

Proteoglycan 4 or lubricin is a proteoglycan that in humans is encoded by the PRG4 gene. It acts as a joint/boundary lubricant.

== Function ==
Lubricin is present in synovial fluid and on the surface (superficial layer) of articular cartilage and therefore plays an important role in joint lubrication and synovial homeostasis. When first isolated, cartilage lubricin was called "superficial zone protein" (SZP). Due to the discovery that the 32-kDa amino terminal fragment of lubricin could stimulate in-vitro megakaryocyte growth, the gene responsible for the expression of lubricin was initially called "megakaryocyte-stimulating factor" (MSF). However, Lubricin, MSF, and SZP are now collectively known as Proteoglycan 4 (hence PRG4 for the gene nomenclature). The evidence that lubricin is actually a proteoglycan is not solid. The expression of lubricin has also been detected and the protein localized in tendon, meniscus, lung, liver, heart, bone, ligament, muscle, and skin. It is present in human plasma, where it binds to neutrophils via L-selectin.

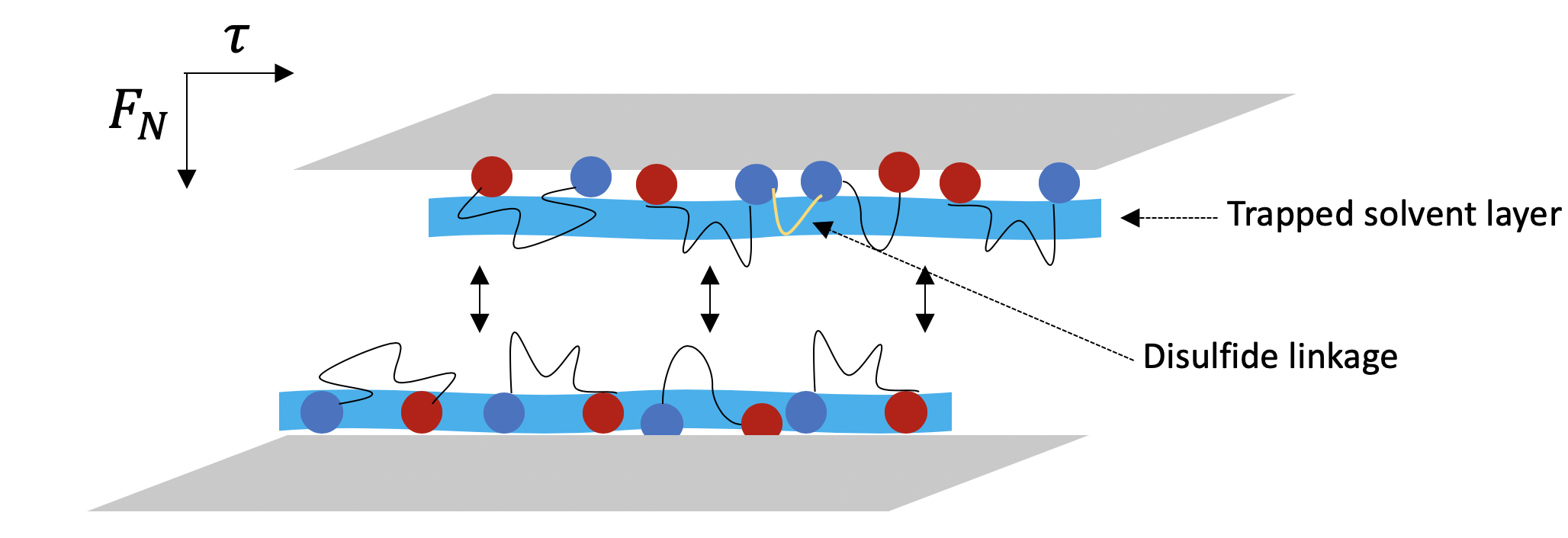
The adhesion of Lubricin's N- (blue) and C- (red) termini to two opposing cartilage surfaces undergoing shear stress (𝜏) and normal forces (𝐹_𝑁). Steric repulsion between mucin domains and hydration forces of the trapped solvent layer are thought to give lubricin its characteristic lubrication ability. Two glycoprotein monomers are linked by a disulfide bond in yellow to form a dimer.

Lubricin shares many properties with other members of the mucin family and similarly plays important roles in protecting cartilage surface from protein deposition and cell adhesion, in inhibiting synovial cell overgrowth, and in preventing cartilage-cartilage adhesion.

Early work on lubricin showed that it was able to lubricate non cartilaginous surfaces as effectively as whole synovial fluid, confirming its important biological lubrication role. Understanding lubricin is key to understanding joint mechanics and friction-based diseases.

== Structure ==
The protein encoded by this gene is a approximately 345 kDa specifically synthesized by chondrocytes located at the surface of articular cartilage, and also by synovial lining cells. The cDNA encodes a protein of 1,404 amino acids (human A isoform) with a somatomedin B homology domain, heparin-binding domains, multiple mucin-like repeats, a hemopexin domain, and an aggregation domain. There are 3 consensus sequences for N-glycosylation and more than 168 sites for O-linked glycosylation.

Lubricin is a large glycoprotein that consists of approximately equal proportions of protein and oligosaccharides. The oligosaccharides are O-linked both with and without sialic acid. Electron microscope measurements show that the lubricin molecule is a partially extended flexible rod and, in solution, occupies a smaller spatial domain than would be expected from structural predictions. The large glycosylated region (i. e mucin domain) of lubricin makes it a water-soluble synovial fluid protein. In synovial fluid it interacts with Galectin-3 that improves its lubricating property. Lubricin's unglycosylated regions can interact with cartilage proteins. This characteristic may aid in the molecule's boundary lubricating ability.

Lubricin is a close analog to vitronectin, as both of these proteins contain a somatomedin B-like (SMB) domain and a hemopexin-like chain. These domains play a unique role in cell-cell and cell-extracellular matrix interactions. However, unlike vitronectin, lubricin carries a central mucin-like domain with a large number of repeating KEPAPTT motifs.

In total, lubricin is approximately 200 nm +/- 50 nm in length and has a diameter of a few nanometers. The glycoprotein consists of >5% serine and >20% threonine residues, which give rise to a large number of O-glycosylations. These are thought to contain short polar (Galβ1-3GalNAcα1-Ser/Thr) and negatively charged (NeuAcα2-3Galβ1-3GalNAcα1α1-Ser/Thr) sugar groups. About two thirds of these sugar groups are capped with sialic acid, and the end domains of the glycoprotein are thought to be globular, due to the nature of their protein-like domains. The N-terminus of lubricin is associated with its SMB-like domains, whereas the C-terminus is associated with the hemopexin-like domain. Due to the protein's overall slight negative charge and the fact that the center of the protein carries negatively charged sugar groups, the two end domains are thought to carry much of the protein's positive charge.

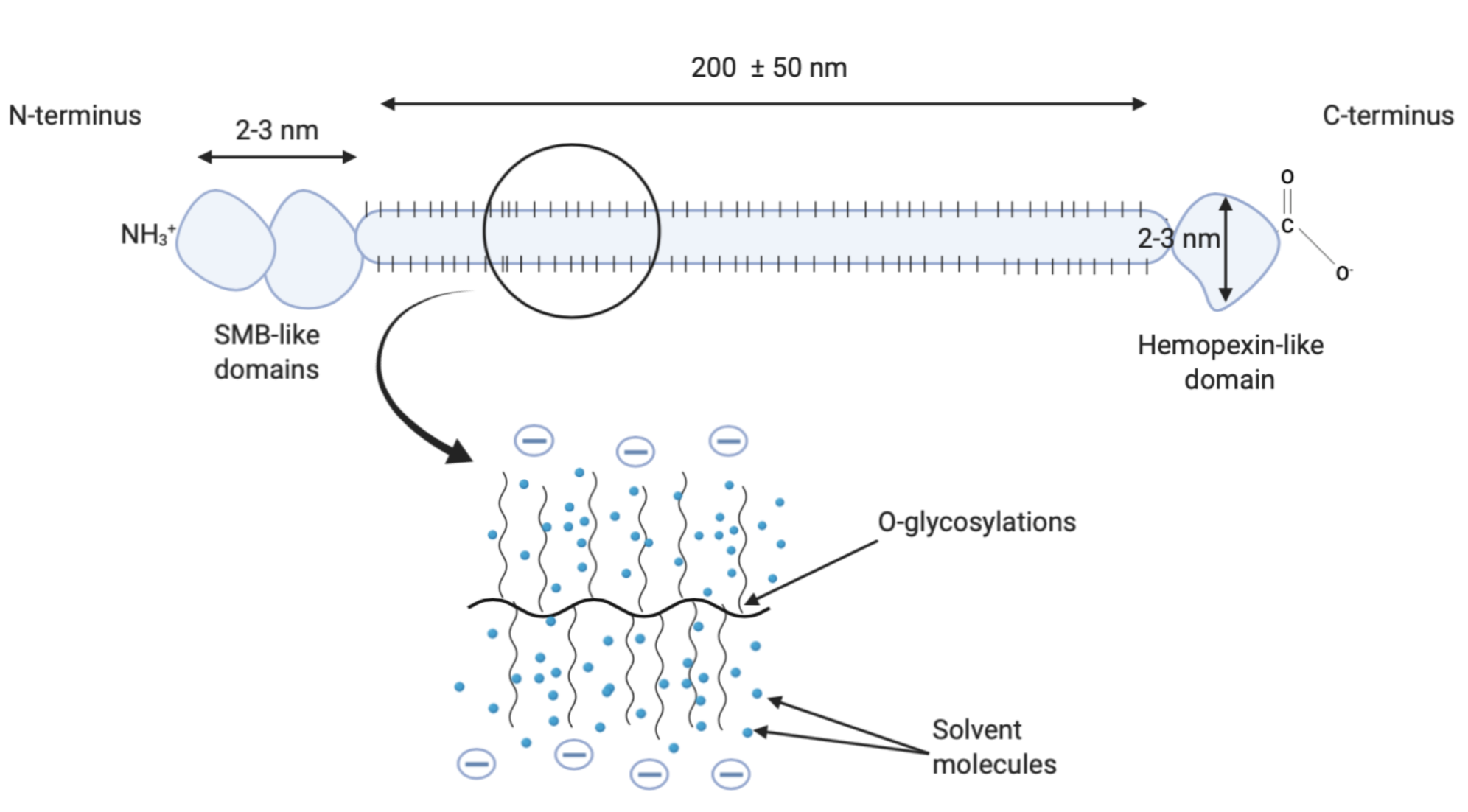
The basic "bottle brush" structure of lubricin, including its mucin, hemopexin-like and somatomedin B (SMB)-like domains.

Lubricin's complex protein structure is termed "bottle brush," which refers to the large number of densely packed glycosylations on lubricin's backbone. Overall, lubricin's structure is similar to other mucin proteins and bottle brush polymers. This structure is key to its lubricating ability, which is ascribed to interchain repulsion. This leads to trapping of large quantities of solvent and the stabilization of a fluid-like cushioning layer, which enables bottle brush polymers to lower the friction between joints when external pressure is applied.

Furthermore, lubricin's N-terminus is thought to create disulfide bonds between two lubricin monomers. The glycoprotein thus exists as both a monomer and a dimer. The adsorption of lubricin to cartilage surfaces occurs through interactions on its N- and C- terminus, where its bottle brush structure plays a role in both coating and repelling similarly coated cartilage surfaces due to steric repulsion. Lubricin's high degree of hydration is also thought to be involved in repulsion forces generated by lubricin between opposing cartilage surfaces.

Shear studies of lubricin adsorbed between various hydrophilic and hydrophobic surfaces have confirmed the importance of the glycoprotein in boundary lubrication and wear protection in articular joints. Lubricin's bottle brush structure is common among a number of human lubricating glycoproteins, and a number of studies have been conducted to mimic this. Researchers have successfully designed low-friction polymers imitating lubricin's bottle-brush-like structure, further supporting the notion that it is lubricin's architecture which plays an important role in reducing friction. Similarly, another study on zwitterionic polymer brushes, which intended to mimic the structure of bottle-brush polymers present in cartilage, found that the brushes produced super low fouling surfaces and super low friction surfaces.

== Clinical significance ==
Lubricin, as MSF, was detected in the urine of patients undergoing bone marrow transplantation during a period of acute thrombocytopenia. Depletion of lubricin function has also been associated with camptodactyly-arthropathy-coxa vara-pericarditis syndrome (CACP), an arthritis-like autosomal recessive disorder.

The locus for autosomal recessive camptodactyly-arthropathy-coxa vara-pericarditis syndrome maps to chromosome 1q25-q31 where the PRG4 gene is located. Cell overgrowth may be primary to the pathogenesis of this protein.

Lubricin's role in improving tendon gliding has also been studied. While adding lubricin alone fails to affect the tendon gliding resistance, the addition of cd-gelatin plus lubricin significantly lowered the gliding resistance of the tendons. This research can aid in improving the gliding ability of tendon grafts done clinically. Extracorporeal shockwave therapy application has been shown to induce an increased lubricin expression in tendons and septa of rat hindlimbs, which might suggest a beneficial lubricating effect for joints and tissues prone to wear and tear degradation.

Furthermore, the synovial fluid of patients with rheumatoid arthritis and osteoarthritis has been shown to exhibit reduced levels of lubricin when compared to healthy patients. Researchers are currently exploring potential applications of lubricin for treating these and other related diseases. Thus far, adding supplement lubricin has been shown to restore the lubricating ability of synovial fluid from patients with established osteoarthritis. Lubricin has been shown to also play a role in anti-inflammation for osteoarthritis patients. Additionally, reduced lubricin levels have also been observed in the synovial fluid of patients with ACL injuries, and decreased lubricating ability has been found in patients with traumatic synovitis.

Lubricin, which is naturally present in human cornea-eyelid interface, has also been shown to play a key role in reducing friction between the cornea and conjunctiva of the eye. Clinical trials of the use of recombinant lubricin eye drops for treatment of dry eye disease have thus far been relatively successful.
