= Blau syndrome =

- Other names: Arthrocutaneouveal granulomatosis
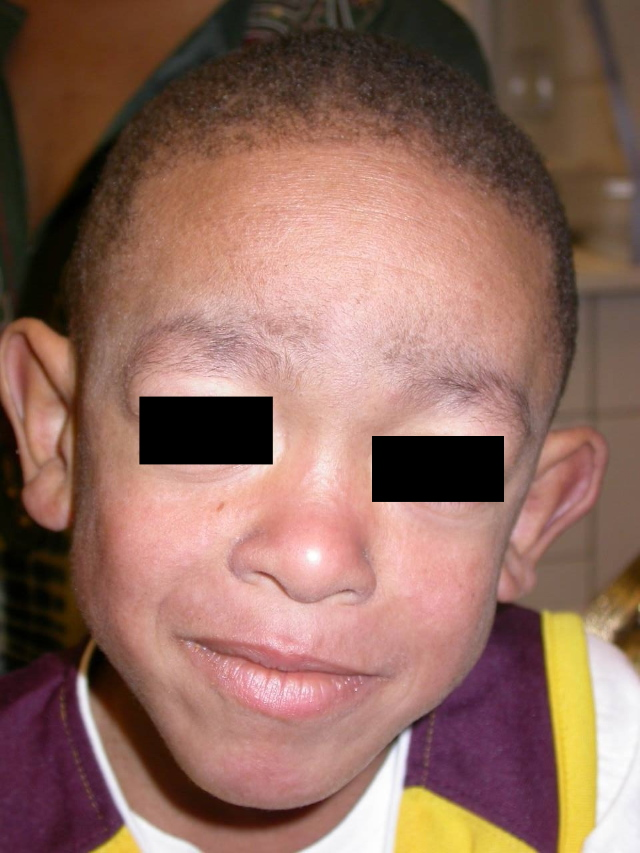
- Coarse facial features in a boy with Blau syndrome
- Specialty: Dermatology

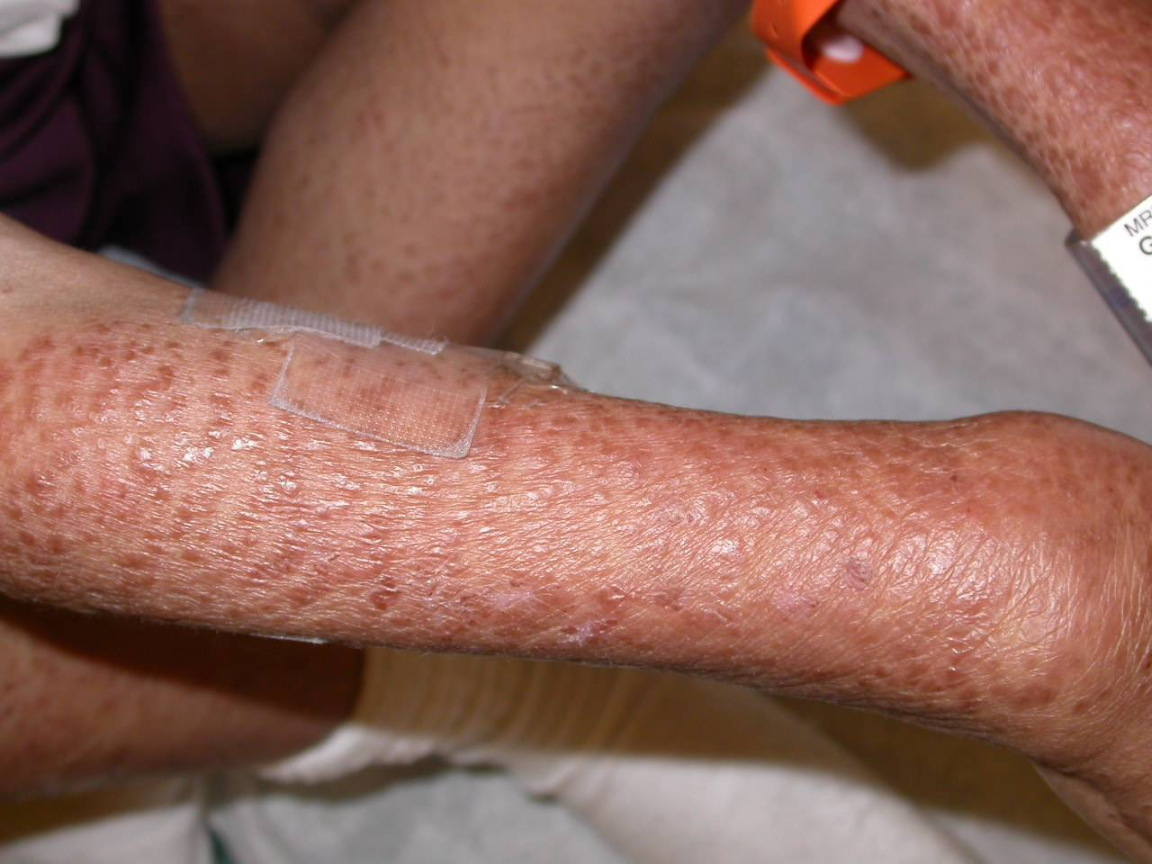
Multiple, reddish-brown papules coalescing over the right arm in a boy with Blau syndrome

Blau syndrome is an autosomal dominant genetic inflammatory disorder which affects the skin, eyes, and joints. It is caused by a mutation in the NOD2 (CARD15) gene. and is classified as an inborn error of immunity. Symptoms usually begin before the age of four, and the disease manifests as early onset cutaneous sarcoidosis, granulomatous arthritis, and uveitis.

== Presentation ==
Blau syndrome classically presents in early childhood as a triad of granulomatous dermatitis, arthritis, and uveitis. Arthritis typically affects peripheral joints mainly wrists, knees, ankles, and proximal interphalangeal (PIP) joints of the hands. Tenosynovitis is another characteristic feature; tendon sheaths appear enlarged on examination; most often the extensor tendons of the wrist, the pes anserinus, peroneal, and flexor tibialis tendon sheaths are affected. Skin rash is typically the first symptom to appear, usually in the first year of life. The most frequent appearance is that of an erythematous maculo-micropapular fine scaly rash on the trunk and extremities. Uveitis presents as an insidious granulomatous iridocyclitis with posterior uveitis in 60–80% of patients.

== Cause ==
The discovery that the gene defect in Blau syndrome involves the CARD15/NOD2 gene has sparked investigation into its function as part of the innate immune system. The innate immune system recognizes pathogen-associated molecular patterns, including bacterial polysaccharides such as muramyl dipeptide, via its pattern recognition receptors, such as NOD2, to induce signaling pathways that activate cytokine responses and protect the organism. In Blau syndrome, the genetic defect seems to lead to overactivation and poor control of the inflammatory response leading to widespread granulomatous inflammation and tissue damage.

== Diagnosis ==
The diagnosis of Blau syndrome is made by the presentation of classical clinical features and can be confirmed by genetic testing and biopsy. Laboratory and imaging studies can be supportive but are usually not diagnostic.

== History ==
In 1981, Malleson et al. reported a family that had autosomal dominant synovitis, camptodactyly, and iridocyclitis. One member died of granulomatous arteritis of the heart and aorta.

In 1982, Rotenstein reported a family with granulomatous arteritis, rash, iritis, and arthritis transmitted as an autosomal dominant trait over three generations.

In 1985, Edward Blau, a pediatrician in Marshfield, Wisconsin, reported a family that over four generations had granulomatous inflammation of the skin, eyes and joints. The condition was transmitted as an autosomal dominant trait. In the same year Jabs et al. reported a family that over two generations had granulomatous synovitis, uveitis and cranial neuropathies.

Then in 1990 Pastores et al. reported a kindred with a phenotype very similar to what Blau described and suggested that the condition be called Blau syndrome. They also pointed out the similarities in the families noted above to Blau syndrome but also pointed out the significant differences in the phenotypes.

In 1996 Tromp et al. conducted a genome wide search using affected and non-affected members of the original family. A marker, D16S298, gave a maximum logarithm of odds score of 3.75 and put the Blau syndrome susceptibility locus within the 16p12-q21 interval. Hugot et al. found a susceptibility locus for Crohn's disease, a granulomatous inflammation of the bowel, on chromosome 16 close to the locus for BS. Based on the above information Blau suggested in 1998 that the genetic defect in Blau syndrome and Crohn disease might be the same or similar.

Finally in 2001 Miceli-Richard et al. found the defect in Blau syndrome to be in the nucleotide-binding domain of CARD15/NOD2. They commented in their article that mutations in CARD15 had also been found in Crohn disease. Confirmation of the defect in Blau syndrome being in the CARD15 gene was made by Wang et al. in 2002 using the Blau syndrome family and others.

== See also ==
- List of cutaneous conditions
