= Jaccoud arthropathy =

- Other names: Jaccoud deformity or Jaccoud's arthopathy
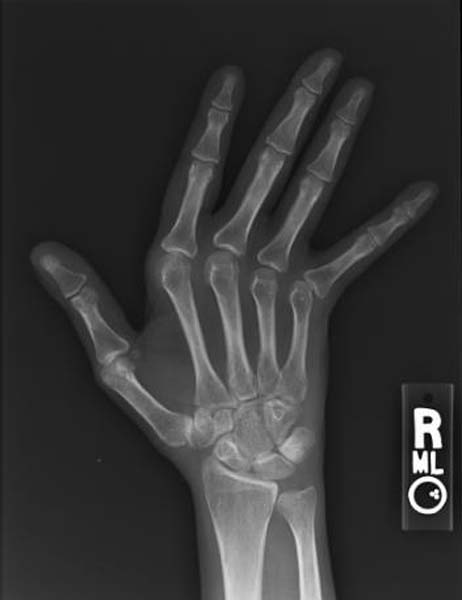
- Jaccoud arthropathy seen on a hand x-ray. As opposed to arthropathy due to rheumatoid arthritis, there are no erosions.
- Specialty: Rheumatology

Jaccoud arthropathy (JA), is a chronic non-erosive reversible joint disorder that may occur after repeated bouts of arthritis. It is caused by inflammation of the joint capsule and subsequent fibrotic retraction, causing ulnar deviation of the fingers, through metacarpophalangeal joint (MCP) subluxation, primarily of the ring and little-finger. Joints in the feet, knees and shoulders may also get affected. It is commonly associated with systemic lupus erythematosus (SLE), and occurs in roughly 5% of all cases.

When associated with rheumatic fever it is also called chronic post–RF arthropathy.

== Presentation ==
=== Associated conditions ===
Originally thought to be associated only with rheumatic fever, it has since been shown to occur also in SLE, Sjögren syndrome, scleroderma, dermatomyositis, psoriatic arthritis, vasculitis, ankylosing spondylitis, mixed connective tissue disease, and pyrophosphate deposition disease. It is distinct from bone erosion which is commonly associated with rheumatoid arthritis, and also distinct from mild deforming arthropathy which is associated with SLE. There have also been cases of non-rheumatic JA associated with Lyme disease, HIV-infection and a number of other conditions.

=== Diagnosis ===
Plain hand radiographs typically show marked ulnar subluxation and deviation at the metacarpophalangeal joints. Absence of erosions is a notable feature, although occasionally "hook" erosions may be observed, which are similar to those seen in SLE and ankylosing spondylitis. Evidence of muscle (soft tissue) atrophy also may be present.

== Treatment ==
The focus of treatment is toward alleviating pain and maintaining functionality of the affected joints through use of nonsteroidal anti-inflammatory drugs, corticosteroids, antimalarial drugs and physiotherapy. Surgery is also a possibility, with osteotomy or stabilization with Kirschner intramedullary wire. Tendon relocation, however, has been shown to only work in 30% of cases. The condition is named after the French 19th century physician Sigismond Jaccoud.

== See also ==
- Swan neck deformity
