= Spinal enthesopathy =

- Specialty: Rheumatology

Spinal enthesopathy is a form of enthesopathy affecting the spine.
