= Tibialis =

Tibialis is an adjectival form of tibia. It may refer to:

== Anatomy ==
- Tibialis anterior artery
- Tibialis anterior muscle
- Tibialis posterior artery
- Tibialis posterior muscle

== Biology ==
- Chasmina tibialis, a species of moth
- Myromexocentrus tibialis, a species of beetle
- Pelatachina tibialis, a species of fly
- Zygoballus tibialis, a species of jumping spider

== See also ==
- Tibial (disambiguation)
- Tbilisi, Georgia
