= Tel Hashomer camptodactyly syndrome =

Genetic disorder

- Other names: Camptodactyly with muscular hypoplasia, skeletal dysplasia, and abnormal palmar creases.
- Specialty: Medical genetics
- Symptoms: Camptodactyly, facial dysmorphisms, and abnormalities throughout the body (both internal and external)
- Usual onset: Birth
- Duration: Life-long
- Causes: Genetic mutation
- Diagnostic method: Physical evaluation, Radiography
- Differential diagnosis: Isolated/idiopathic variant of all of the symptoms
- Prevention: none
- Prognosis: Ok
- Frequency: Very rare, 23 cases have been reported across the world

Tel Hashomer camptodactyly syndrome is a rare genetic disorder which is characterized by camptodactyly,( a condition where one or more fingers or toes are permanently bent), facial dysmorphisms, and fingerprint, skeletal and muscular abnormalities. This disorder is thought to be inherited in an autosomal recessive fashion.

== Presentation ==
This disorder has symptoms that affect the feet, hands, muscles, fingerprints, skeleton, heart and back, these include: talipes equinovarus (clubfeet), thenar/hypothenar hypoplasia, abnormalities of the palmar crease and the fingerprints, hypertelorism, long philtrum, spina bifida, and mitral valve prolapse.

== Etymology ==
This disorder was discovered in the late 1960s to mid-1970s by Richard M Goodman, a US-born geneticist working in Tel Aviv, Israel. Since 2016, only 23 cases of this disorder have been reported in medical literature.

== Cases ==
The following is a list of every case report of the disorder.

1. Goodman et al. describes Tel-Hashomer camptodactyly syndrome for the first time in history in two siblings that came from non-consanguineous parents.
2. Goodman et al. observes two additional cases of the disorder
3. Gollop and Colleto et al. describe members from two consanguineous Brazilian families.
4. Patton et al. shows that the muscle weakness in the disorder is caused by abnormal muscle histology
5. Tylki-Szymanska reports two people with the disorder whose parents were first cousins
6. Pagnan et al. describes two siblings from a Brazilian family
7. Toriello et al. describes two Latin American siblings with the disorder, both of them showing mitral valve prolapse
8. Zareen and Rashmi describe two Indian sisters with the disorder who came from a non-consanguineous family, both of them presented hirsutism, a feature not seen before in Tel Hashomer camptodactyly.
