= Sigismond Jaccoud =

Swiss physician

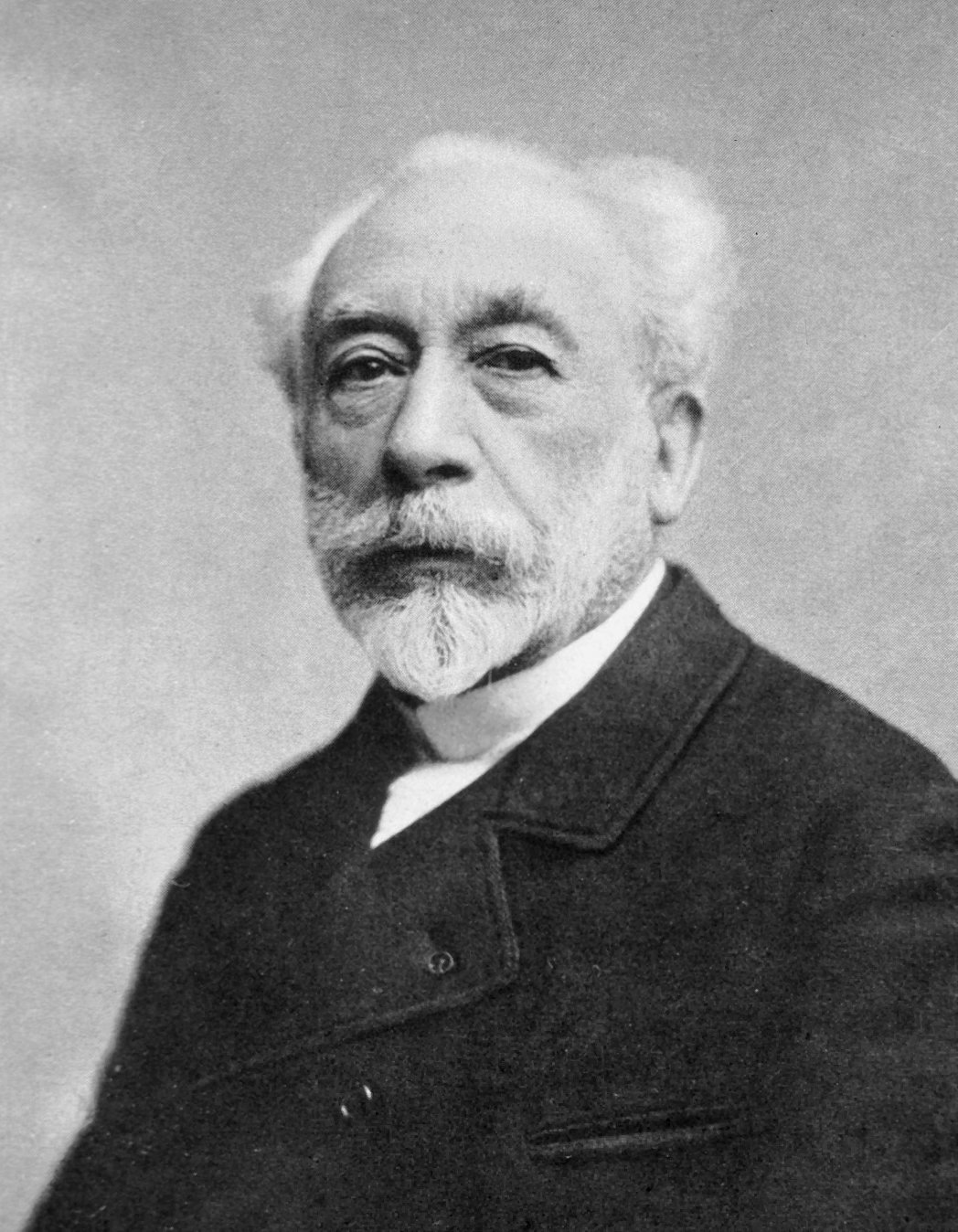
Sigismond Jaccoud

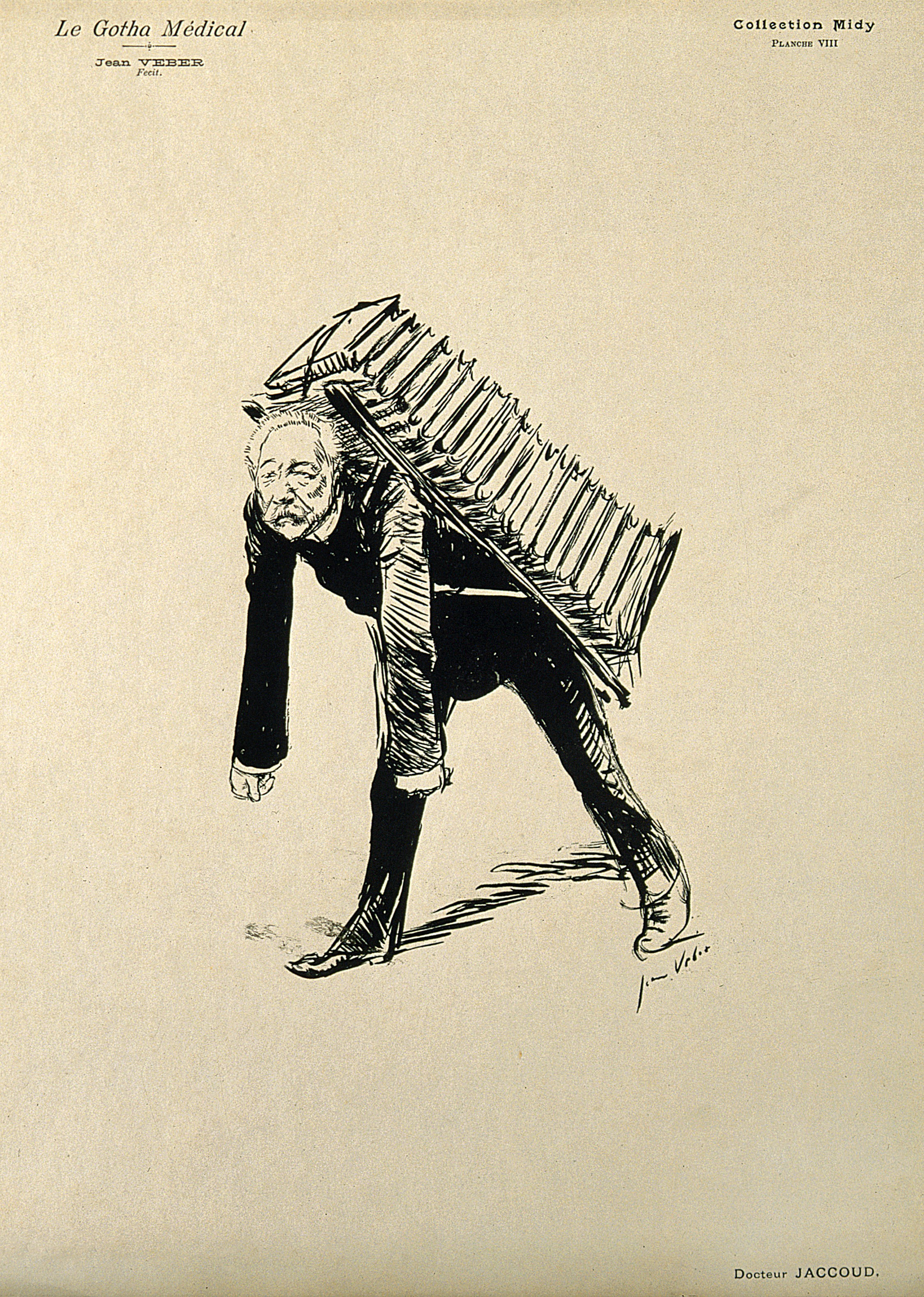
Caricature of Sigismond Jaccound burdened with library books, Jean Veber, Le Gotha médical, Collection Midy.

Sigismond Jaccoud (20 November 1830 – 26 April 1913) was a Swiss physician.

Sigismond Jaccoud was born in 1830 in Geneva, where he went to school and was educated in music and the science of literature. In 1849 he went to Paris to study medicine – and supported himself in that city teaching music and literature. He became interne des hopitaux in 1855. After graduation in 1859 he specialised in internal medicine and in 1860 defended his doctoral thesis, on the pathogenesis of albuminuria. In 1862 he became medecin des hopitaux, in 1863 professeur. In 1877 he was appointed professor of internal pathology at the medical faculty and member of the Académie Nationale de Médecine. In 1898 he became president of the Academy.

Jaccoud was a very famous and highly estimated lecturer at several of Paris' hospitals – L'Hôpital Saint-Antoine, l'Hôpital de la Charité, l'Hôpital Lariboisière and l'Hôpital de la Pitié-Salpétrière. Following the death of Ernest-Charles Lasègue (1816–1883) in 1883, he was also made professor of internal medicine at the Pitié hospital in Paris.

In 1883 he published a three-volume work on pathology, comprising almost 3.000 pages. In rheumatology, and partly in cardiology, Jaccoud was probably best known for his 23. Lecture, which has been perpetuated in medical history because of its description of Jaccoud's syndrome. At the turn of the 20th century rheumatic fever ravaged among children and youth, and the fact that there was, unlike today, no rational pharmaceutical therapy available, interest concentrated on the natural course of the disease.

As he published his lectures in book form, they are still available for study – covering a wide variety of medical questions. On tuberculosis, with its numerous complications, no less than ten lectures were published.

In his books he emphasised how he enjoyed thorough clinical examinations, epidemiology, research and teaching.

Jaccoud died in 1913, at the age of 83 years.

Jaccoud published numerous articles in Dictionnaire de Médecine et de Chirurgie pratiques of which he was co-publisher.

== Terms ==
- Jaccoud's arthropathy — a deformity of the fingers, causing them to deviate away from the thumb.
- Jaccoud's dissociated fever — fever with slow and irregular pulse in tuberculous meningitis of adults.
- Jaccoud's sign — prominence of the aorta in the suprasternal notch: an indication of leukemia.
