= Fibroblast-like synoviocyte =

Specialised cell type located inside joints in the synovium

Details
- Location: Synovium

Fibroblast-like synoviocytes (FLS) represent a specialised cell type located inside joints in the synovium. These cells play a crucial role in the pathogenesis of chronic inflammatory diseases, such as rheumatoid arthritis.

== Fibroblast-like synoviocytes in normal tissues ==
The inner lining of the joint consists of the synovium (also called the synovial membrane), a thin layer located between the joint capsule and the joint cavity. The word "synovium" is derived from the word "synovia" (or synovial fluid), which is a clear, viscous fluid produced by the synovium, and its main purpose is to reduce friction between the joint cartilages during movement. Synovium is also important to maintain proper joint function by providing the structural support and supply of the necessary nutrients to the surrounding cartilage. Synovial membrane is divided into two compartments – the outer layer (subintima) and the inner layer (intima). The inner layer is mainly composed of two cell types, specialized macrophages (macrophage-like synovial cells) and fibroblast-like synoviocytes, which are important in maintaining the internal joint homeostasis. These cells represent the main source of hyaluronic acid and also other glycoproteins, major components of the synovial fluid.

Fibroblast-like synoviocytes are cells of mesenchymal origin that display many characteristics common with fibroblasts, such as expression of several types of collagens and protein vimentin, a part of cytoskeletal filaments. Unlike fibroblasts, fibroblast-like synoviocytes also secrete unique proteins, that are normally absent in other fibroblast lineages. These include especially lubricin, a protein crucial for the joint lubrication. Furthermore, these cells express a number of molecules important for the mediation of the cell adhesion, such as cadherin-11, VCAM-1, various integrins and their receptors. Specific for fibroblast-like synoviocytes is also the expression of CD55; this protein is often used to identify this cell type in the synovium by immunohistochemistry.

== The role of fibroblast-like synoviocytes in the pathogenesis of rheumatoid arthritis ==
Synovial hyperplasia (an increase in cell number) is a typical feature of the autoimmune disease called rheumatoid arthritis (RA). During the progression of this disease the synovial membrane becomes a place where constant inflammatory processes take place, which can eventually lead to cartilage damage and joint destruction and deformation. Due to the changes in proliferative and apoptotic processes the total number of cells increases in the synovium, and significantly increases also the number of fibroblast-like synoviocytes (FLS). These cells, together with other immune cells such as macrophages, lymphocytes, neutrophils, mast cells, dendritic cells and platelets, create an inflammatory environment in the synovium, attract more immune cells to the damaged place and thus contribute to the joint destruction.

FLS that are present in the synovium during RA display altered phenotype compared to the cells present in normal tissues. They lose the property called contact inhibition (cells arrest their growth in the case when more cells come into contact with each other), and they also lose the growth dependency on adhesive surfaces; both these phenomena contribute to the increase in the number of FLS in the inflammatory tissue and are also typical for example for the growth of cancerous cells. In addition, these cells can produce a number of pro-inflammatory signalling molecules, especially Il-6 and IL-8, prostanoids and matrix metalloproteinases (MMPs), which may directly affect other cells and also participate in the inflammation enhancement. These processes are influenced by microvesicles derived from platelets, which can contribute to the activation of fibroblast-like synoviocytes through secretion of IL-1.

The aggressive phenotype of FLS in RA and the effect these cells have on their microenvironment can be summarized into hallmarks that distinguish them from healthy FLS. These hallmark features of FLS in RA are divided into 7 cell-intrinsic hallmarks and 4 cell-extrinsic hallmarks. The cell-intrinsic hallmarks are: reduced apoptosis, impaired contact inhibition, increased migratory invasive potential, changed epigenetic landscape, temporal and spatial heterogeneity, genomic instability and mutations, and reprogrammed cellular metabolism. The cell-extrinsic hallmarks of FLS in RA are: promotes osteoclastogenesis and bone erosion, contributes to cartilage degradation, induces synovial angiogenesis, and recruits and stimulates immune cells.
