= Camptodactyly =

Permanent bending of a finger or toe

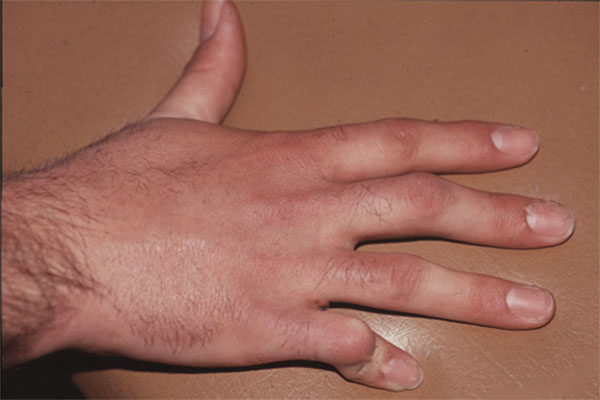
- Pronunciation: kamp-toh-dak-tih-lee
- Specialty: Medical genetics
- Symptoms: Permanent flexion of the proximal interphalangeal joints, although symptoms may vary in person; some people have very tight flexed fingers and other people have flexed fingers that straighten when pressed on
- Complications: People with severe camptodactyly may have difficulty holding objects
- Usual onset: There are congenital forms, adolescent-onset forms and acquired forms
- Duration: Life-long
- Treatment: Splinting, surgery, etc.
- Frequency: 1% of the world population

Camptodactyly is a medical condition that causes one or more digits (fingers or toes) to be permanently bent. It involves fixed flexion deformity of the proximal interphalangeal joints.

Camptodactyly can be caused by a genetic disorder. In that case, it is an autosomal dominant trait that is known for its incomplete genetic expressivity. This means that when a person has the genes for it, the condition may appear in both hands, one, or neither. A linkage scan proposed that the chromosomal locus of camptodactyly was 3q11.2-q13.12.

== Causes ==
The specific cause of camptodactyly remains unknown, but there are a few deficiencies that lead to the condition. A deficient lumbrical muscle controlling the flexion of the fingers, and abnormalities of the flexor and extensor tendons.

A number of congenital syndromes may also cause camptodactyly:

- Jacobsen syndrome
- Beals syndrome
- Blau syndrome
- Freeman–Sheldon syndrome
- Cerebrohepatorenal syndrome
- Weaver syndrome
- Christianson syndrome
- Gordon syndrome
- Jaccoud arthropathy
- Lenz microphthalmia syndrome
- Marshall–Smith–Weaver syndrome
- Oculo-dento-digital syndrome
- Tel Hashomer camptodactyly syndrome
- Toriello–Carey syndrome
- Trisomy 13
- Trisomy 16
- Stuve–Wiedemann syndrome
- Loeys–Dietz syndrome
- Fetal alcohol syndrome
- Fryns syndrome
- Marfan syndrome
- Carnio-carpo-tarsal dystrophy

== Genetics ==
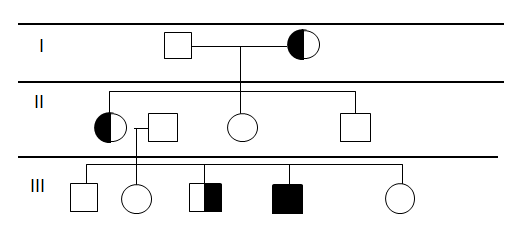
Example of a pedigree of Camptodactyly inheritance

The pattern of inheritance is determined by the phenotypic expression of a gene—which is called expressivity. Camptodactyly can be passed on through generations in various levels of phenotypic expression, which include both or only one hand. This means that the genetic expressivity is incomplete. It can be inherited from either parent.

In most of its cases, camptodactyly occurs sporadically, but it has been found in several studies that it is inherited as an autosomal dominant condition.

== Treatment ==
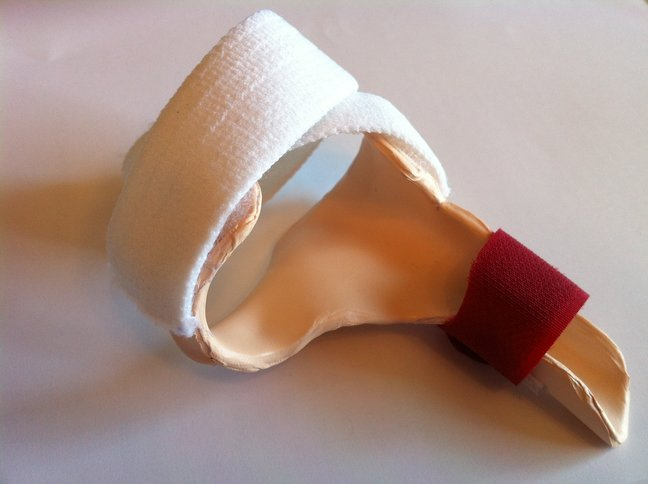
Splint for the left little (pinky) finger of a 7-year-old child

If a contracture is less than 30 degrees, it may not interfere with normal functioning. The common treatment is splinting and occupational therapy. Surgery is the last option for most cases as the result may not be satisfactory.

== Etymology ==
The name is derived from the ancient Greek words καμπτός, kamptos (bent) and δάκτυλος, daktylos (finger).

== See also ==
Camptodactyly in Living Textbook of Hand Surgery https://books.publisso.de/en/publisso_gold/publishing/books/overview/49/510

- Clinodactyly
