= Tibial =

Tibial may refer to:

- Tibia bone
- Tibial nerve
- Anterior tibial artery
- Posterior tibial artery
- Anterior tibial vein
- Posterior tibial vein
- Insect tibia
