= Cervicocranial syndrome =

- Other names: Craniocervical junction syndrome
- Specialty: Neurology

Cervicocranial syndrome or (craniocervical junction syndrome, CCJ syndrome) is a combination of symptoms that are caused by an abnormality in the cervical vertebrae leading to improper function of cervical spinal nerves. Cervicocranial syndrome is either congenital or acquired. Cervicocranial syndrome may be caused by Chiari disease, Klippel-Feil malformation, osteoarthritis, and physical trauma. Treatment options include neck braces, pain medication and surgery. The quality of life for individuals suffering from Cervicocranial syndrome can improve through surgery.

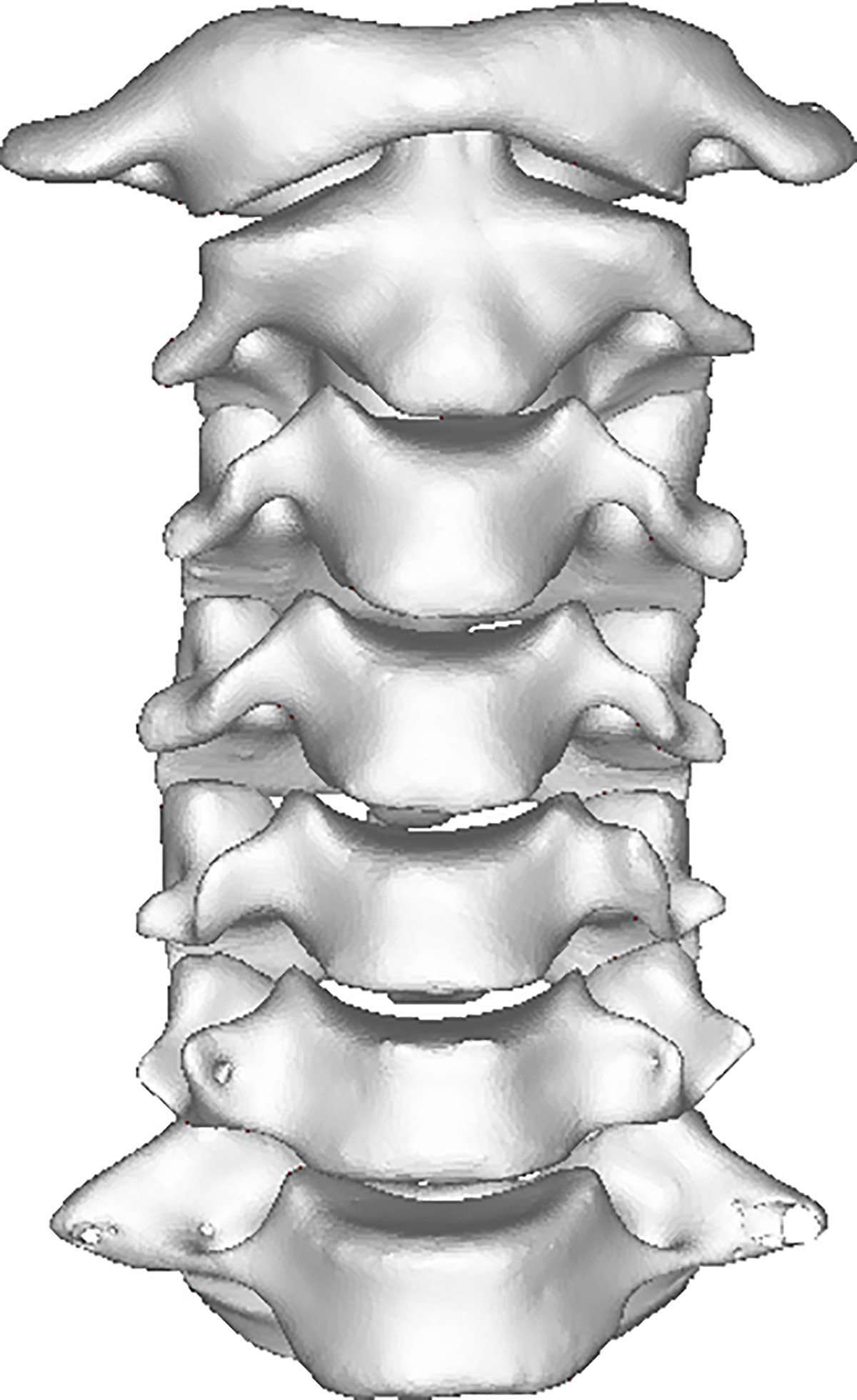
Cervical Vertebrae (C1 - C7)

== Signs and symptoms ==
Cervicocranial syndrome has a wide range of symptoms. These symptoms often include:

- Vertigo
- Chronic headache a.k.a. cephalea
- Tinnitus
- Facial pain
- Ear pain
- Dysphagia
- Carotidynia
- Neck pain (ex: during movement such extension and flexion)
- Syncope
- Sinus congestion
- Neck crepitus sound
- Loss of vision
- Involuntary eye-movement
- Severe fatigue
- Chest pain
- Brain fog

== Cause ==
Cervicocranial syndrome can be caused either due to a defect (genetic mutation or development of diseases later in life) or an injury pertaining to the cervical area of the neck that damages the spinal nerves traveling through the cervical region resulting in ventral subluxation. Examples of cases that can result in cervicocranial syndrome are: car accidents, trauma, osteoarthritis, tumor, degenerative pathology and other numerous causes of vertebral instability. There is no single cause that can mainly cause cervicocranial syndrome.

=== Genetic ===
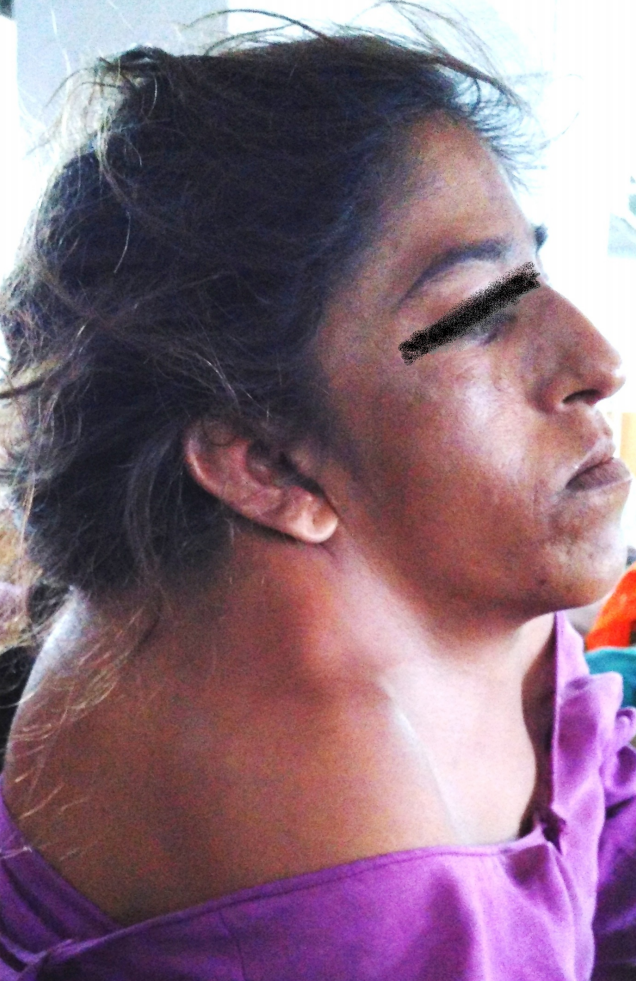
Individual with Klippel-Feil syndrome showing fused cervical bones in the neck

The genes GDF6, GDF3, MEOX1 used as examples, encode for making proteins that help with development. For example GDF6 gene plays an important role in bone development and joint formation. The mutation in these genes can result in Klippel-Feil syndrome. As a result of having congenital Klippel-Feil syndrome, the spinal anatomy of the individual will present abnormal fusion of any two of the seven cervical bones in the neck. This is considered to be an anomaly of cervical bones. It affects the functioning of cervical spinal nerves (C1 - C8) because of compression on the spinal cord. Spinal stenosis also adds damage to the spinal cord resulting in symptoms that are caused by cervicocranial syndrome.

=== Trauma ===
Traumatic injuries are caused when external forces damage the cervical spine, giving rise to various symptoms. In a motor vehicle accident, the vehicle jerks the neck forward and backward resulting in cervical spine damage. This is called whiplash. The neurological and biological symptoms resulting from neck trauma emerge as a culmination of clinically isolated or combined symptoms caused by cervicocranial syndrome.

== Pathophysiology ==
The body is innervated by spinal nerves that branch off from the spinal cord. This innervation enables the brain to receive sensory inputs and send motor outputs. There are 8 cervical spinal nerves of the peripheral nervous system. Cervical spinal nerves C1, C2 and C3 help control the movements of the head and neck. Cervical spinal nerve C4 helps control upward shoulder movements. Cervical spinal nerve C3, C4 and C5 help power the diaphragm and aid in breathing. Cervical spinal nerve C6 helps in wrist extension and some functioning of biceps. Cervical spinal nerve C7 controls triceps and wrist extension. Cervical spinal nerve C8 helps control the hand. The cervicocranial syndrome occurs when symptoms arise due to cervical vertebrae damage (misalignment, collapse, shift or disease, such as tumor) resulting in the improper functioning of the cervical spinal nerves.

=== Examples of cervicocranial syndrome pathophysiology ===
==== Chordoma ====
The craniocervical junction region comprises C1 (atlas), C2 (axis) and the lower part of the skull: occipital bone. In case of tumor: chordoma, in the craniocervical junction region, this leads to pressure on the cervical spinal nerves, which results in their improper functioning of the cervical spinal nerves. Hence, leading to symptoms of cervicocranial syndrome. To decompress the pressure on the nerves, the tumor is removed and the foramen through which the spinal nerve roots travel through is enlarged to allow the nerves to pass through so that symptoms of cervicocranial syndrome can be reduced and the nerves are sending signals.

==== Atlanto-occipital assimilation ====
When the occipital bone and the atlas (C1) are fused together in a condition called atlanto-occipital assimilation, it causes improper functioning of the cervical spinal nerves due to the vascular compression. Surgical procedure can decompress the nerves and reduce symptoms.

==== Trauma ====
Traumatic injuries are caused when external forces damage the cervical spine, giving rise to various symptoms. In a car accident, the vehicle jerks the neck forward and backward resulting in cervical spine damage resulting in a whiplash. As a result, the cervical spine become misaligned and produces direct spinal cord irritation creating tighter muscles on one side of the body Neck braces can help temporarily. Surgery is required if needed. Non-surgical treatment, to realign spinal misalignment, is corrected by a chiropractor.

== Diagnosis ==
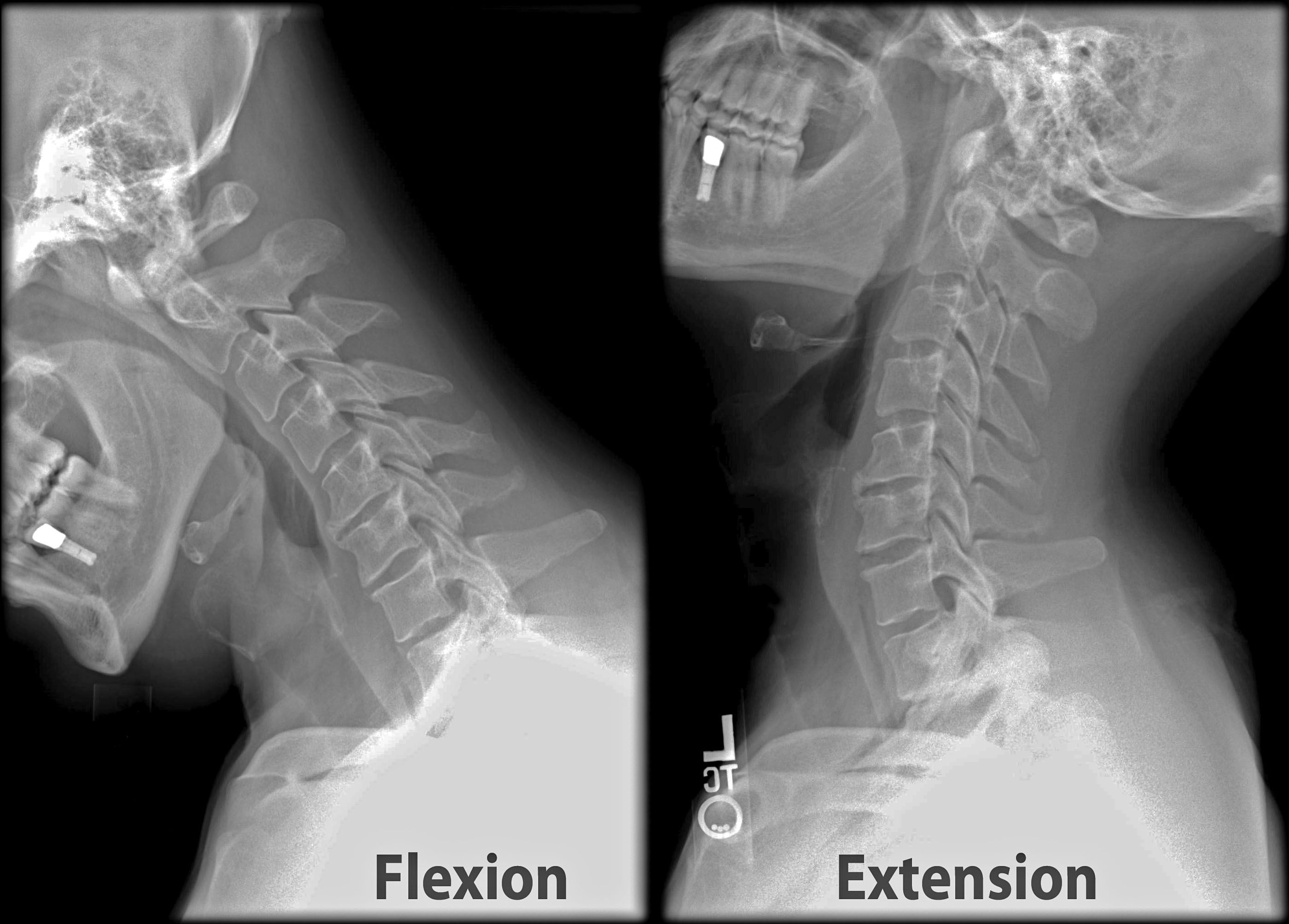
1. Cervical spine x-ray (lateral view)

Once there is an onset of the symptoms in the patient, the patients are screened through cervical-spinal imaging techniques: X-ray, CT, MRI. The scanning technique points out any cervical vertebrae defects and misalignments. (Image 1. and 2.) When cervicocranial syndrome is caused as a result of a genetic disease, then family history and genetic testing aid in making an accurate diagnosis of cervicocranial syndrome.

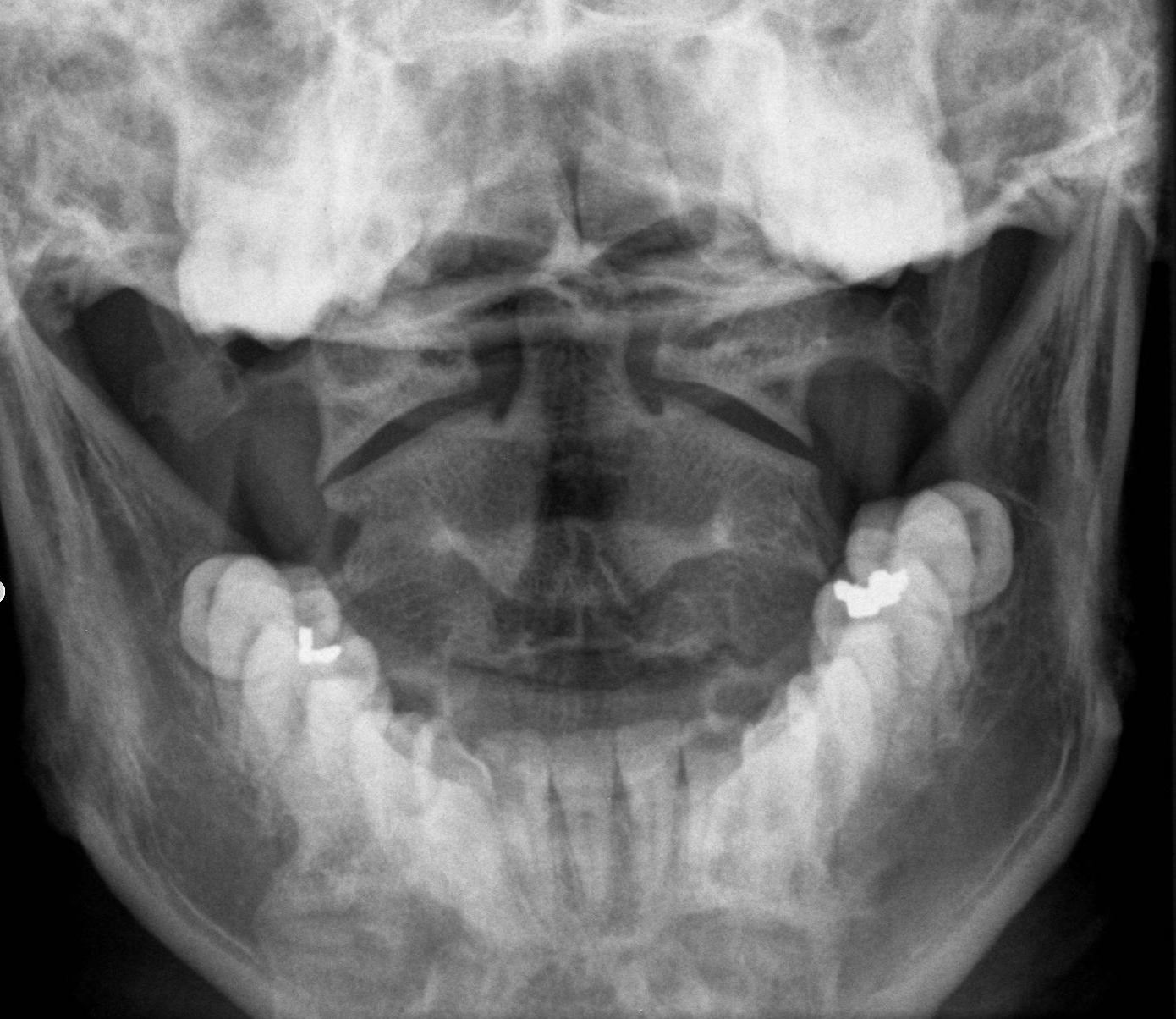
2. Cervical spine x-ray (odontoid view)

== Prevention and treatment ==
The treatment options vary since there are numerous causes of cervicocranial syndrome. General treatments include:

- Pressure release via realignment of the vertebrae
- Pain medication: acetaminophen, aspirin, or ibuprofen
- Manipulation of neck by chiropractor: For example, vertigo symptoms can be relieved
- Neck braces to avoid movement of neck and provide stability
- Physical therapy
- Injection: Combination (anesthetic and cortisone) drug to help alleviate the pain
- Surgery to restore function and form of the spine
- Cervical spinal cord stimulation (cSCS)

When cervicocranial syndrome is caused by a mutation in genes and it runs in the family due to other co-morbidities, genetic counseling helps patients cover risks, prevention and expectations of caring and passing genes to a newborn.

== Prognosis ==
The prognosis of individuals living with cervicocranial syndrome varies due to multiple causes such as co-morbidities and varied trauma. Instability of the cervical spine can cause endangerment of patients and their neurological integrity. Correction and decompression cervical spinal surgeries significantly increase quality of life and reduce symptoms. Post-surgery, 93 to 100 percent of patients report reduced cervicocranial syndrome symptoms such as neck pain.

== Epidemiology ==
Cervicocranial syndrome significantly affects the aging world population and is associated with significant morbidity. It affects men and women equally when occurring due to atlanto-occipital assimilation. Increased incidence among low-socioeconomic groups and among groups that do not have access to healthcare show subsequently higher rates of morbidity and mortality.

== Research directions ==
Cervicocranial syndrome can be caused with or as a result of numerous neurological problems so not one single disease can be pinpointed. Further research can explore the common neurological problems causing cervicocranial syndrome and look at various treatments including therapeutic ones.

For example, a study, "The influence of cranio-cervical rehabilitation in patients with myofascial temporomandibular pain disorders", explored the therapeutic options of physical therapy and concluded that 88% from a total of 98 patients (79 female and 19 male), felt reduced pain. On the contrary another study, "The efficacy of manual therapy and therapeutic exercise in patients with chronic neck pain: A narrative review" conducted in 2018, concluded that there is a lack of evidence that support therapeutic exercise to reduce neck pain via manipulation.
