= Traumatic spondylopathy =

- Specialty: Rheumatology

Traumatic spondylopathy is a form of dorsopathy. It is a slippage of a vertebral body secondary to a traumatic injury.
