= Bicipital tenosynovitis =

Bicipital tenosynovitis is tendinitis or inflammation of the tendon and sheath lining of the biceps muscle. It is often the result of many years of small tears or other degenerative changes in the tendon first manifesting in middle age, but can be due to a sudden injury. Calcification of the tendon, and osteophytes ("bone spurs") in the intertubercular groove can be apparent on x-rays. The condition (which can also occur in dogs) is commonly treated with physical therapy and cortisone.
