= Bone erosion =

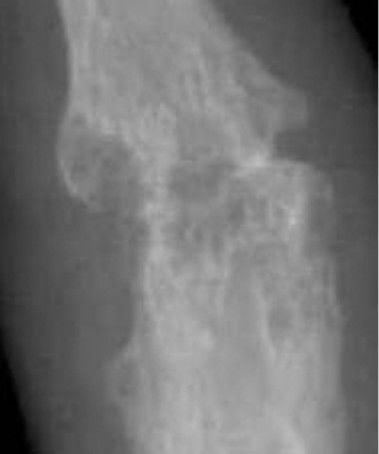
- Bone erosions by rheumatoid arthritis.
- Specialty: Orthopedics

Bone erosion is the loss of bone from disease processes. Erosive arthritis is joint inflammation (arthritis) with bone destruction, and such conditions include rheumatoid arthritis. Bone erosion is the loss of bone in a certain area, rather than a change in bone density, which is found in osteoporosis. Surprisingly, bone erosion is not common in osteoarthritis, although there is a subtype of osteoarthritis (erosive osteoarthritis) that may result in bone erosion.
