= Calcium pyrophosphate =

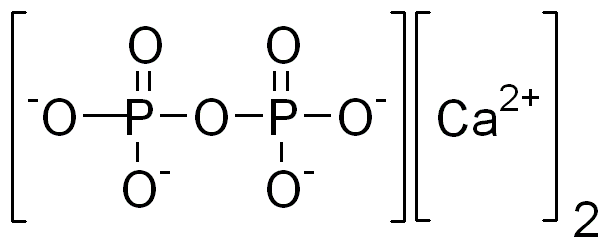

Names
- IUPAC name Calcium diphosphate
- Other names: Diphosphoric acid, calcium salt (1:2); Dicalcium diphosphate; Dicalcium pyrophosphate

Identifiers
CAS Number	7790-76-3
3D model (JSmol)	Interactive image
ChEBI	CHEBI:32598
ChemSpider	23034
ECHA InfoCard	100.029.292
E number	E450(vi) (thickeners, ...)
MeSH	Calcium+pyrophosphate
PubChem CID	24632
UNII	X69NU20D19
CompTox Dashboard (EPA)	DTXSID50872512
- InChI: InChI=1S/2Ca.H4O7P2/c;;1-8(2,3)7-9(4,5)6/h;;(H2,1,2,3)(H2,4,5,6)/q2*+2;/p-4 Key: JUNWLZAGQLJVLR-UHFFFAOYSA-J; InChI=1/2Ca.H4O7P2/c;;1-8(2,3)7-9(4,5)6/h;;(H2,1,2,3)(H2,4,5,6)/q2*+2;/p-4 Key: JUNWLZAGQLJVLR-XBHQNQODAN
- SMILES: [Ca+2].[Ca+2].[O-]P([O-])(=O)OP([O-])([O-])=O

Properties
Chemical formula	Ca_{2}O_{7}P_{2}
Molar mass	254.053 g/mol
Appearance	White powder
Density	3.09 g/cm^{3}
Melting point	1,353 °C (2,467 °F; 1,626 K)
Solubility in water	insoluble
Solubility	soluble in HCl, nitric acids
Refractive index (n_{D})	1.585

Hazards
NFPA 704 (fire diamond)	2 0 0
Flash point	Non-flammable

Related compounds
Other anions	Calcium phosphate
Other cations	Magnesium pyrophosphate Sodium pyrophosphate
- Except where otherwise noted, data are given for materials in their standard state (at 25 °C [77 °F], 100 kPa). verify (what is ?) Infobox references

Calcium pyrophosphate refers to any member of a series of inorganic compound with the formula Ca_{2}P_{2}O_{7}(H_{2}O)_{n}. They are white solids that are insoluble in water. They contain the pyrophosphate anion, although sometimes they are referred to as phosphates. The inventory includes an anhydrous form, a dihydrate (Ca_{2}P_{2}O_{7}·2H_{2}O), and a tetrahydrate (Ca_{2}P_{2}O_{7}·4H_{2}O). Deposition of dihydrate crystals in cartilage is responsible for the severe joint pain in cases of calcium pyrophosphate deposition disease (pseudo gout) whose symptoms are similar to those of gout. Ca_{2}P_{2}O_{7} is commonly used as a mild abrasive agent in toothpastes because of its insolubility and nonreactivity toward fluoride.

In 2025, a natural analogue of synthetic β-Ca2P2O7 was found in a super-deep diamond from the Chapadão plateau, Mato Grosso, Brazil. It has been named grahampearsonite to recognize the contributions to diamond research of Graham Pearson.

== Preparation ==
Crystals of the tetrahydrate can be prepared by treating a solution of sodium pyrophosphate with calcium nitrate with careful control of pH and temperature:

Na_{4}P_{2}O_{7}(aq)+2 Ca(NO_{3})_{2}(aq)→ Ca_{2}P_{2}O_{7}·4 H_{2}O + 4 NaNO_{3}

The dihydrate, sometimes termed CPPD, can be formed by the reaction of pyrophosphoric acid with calcium chloride:

CaCl_{2} + H_{4}P_{2}O_{7}(aq) → Ca_{2}P_{2}O_{7}·2 H_{2}O + HCl.

The anhydrous forms can be prepared by heating dicalcium phosphate:

2 CaHPO_{4} → Ca_{2}P_{2}O_{7} + H_{2}O

At 240-500 °C an amorphous phase is formed, heating to 750 °C forms β-Ca_{2}P_{2}O_{7}, heating to 1140 - 1350 °C forms the α-Ca_{2}P_{2}O_{7}.

== Structure of anhydrous and hydrated forms ==
The stable tetrahydrate was originally reported to be rhombohedral but is now believed to be monoclinic. Additionally there is an unstable monoclinic form.

The dihydrate is triclinic, with hydrogen bonding between the two water molecules and hydrogen bonds to the O atoms on the anion. An hexagonal dihydrate has also been reported.

The anhydrous form has three polymorphs: α-, β-, and metastable γ (T_{α/β}=1140ºС). The high temperature form α- is monoclinic (P2_{1}/n, a=12.66(1)Å, b=8.542(8)Å, c=5.315(5)Å, Z=4, ρ_{α}=2.95 g/cm^{3}), with 8 coordinate calcium, the lower temperature form β- is tetragonal (P4_{1}, a=b=6.684Å, c=24.144Å, V=915.40Å^{3}, Z=8, ρ_{β}=3.128 g/cm^{3}), with calcium in four different coordination environments, two that are 7 coordinate, one 8 and one 9. In both the pyrophosphates are essentially eclipsed.
