= Calcium pyrophosphate dihydrate crystal deposition disease =

Crystal arthritis resembling gout

Calcium pyrophosphate dihydrate disease
- Other names: Pseudogout
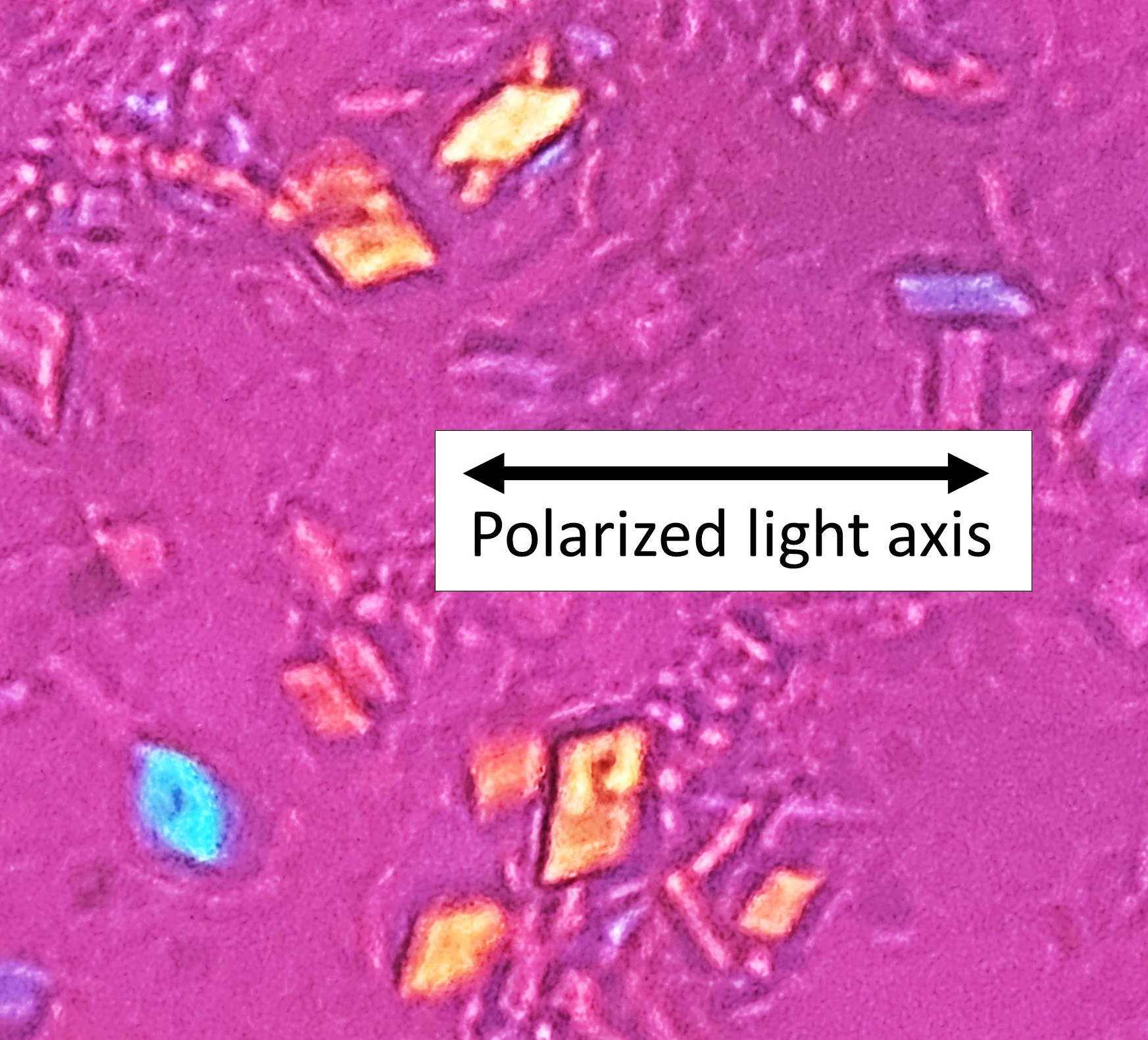
- Polarized light microscopy of CPPD, showing rhombus-shaped calcium pyrophosphate crystals with positive birefringence.

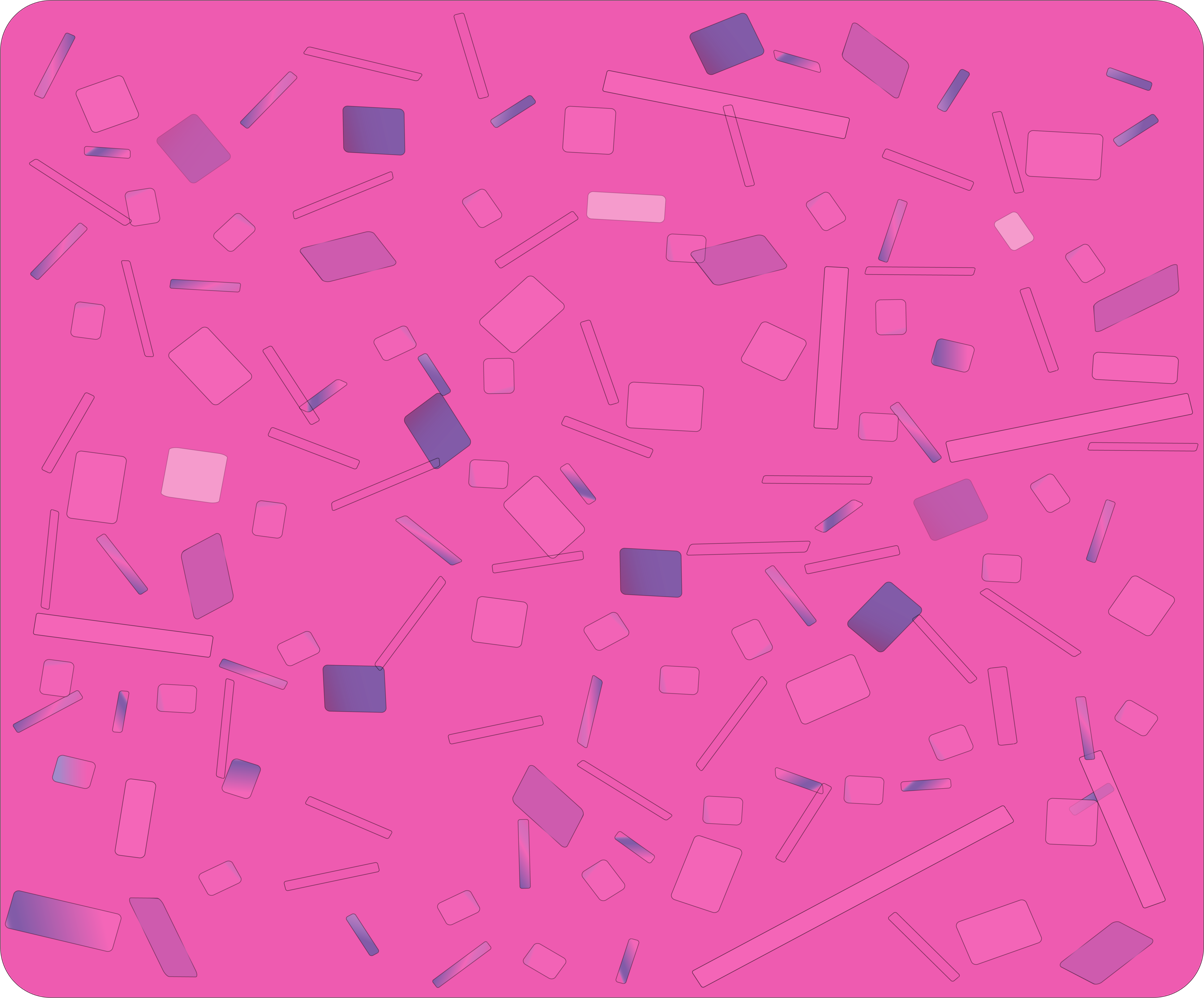
Artistic depiction of pseudogout crystals (calcium pyrophosphate dihydrate crystals)

Calcium pyrophosphate dihydrate (CPPD) crystal deposition disease, also known as pseudogout and pyrophosphate arthropathy, is a rheumatologic disease which is thought to be secondary to abnormal accumulation of calcium pyrophosphate dihydrate crystals within joint soft tissues. The knee joint is most commonly affected. The disease is metabolic in origin and its treatment remains symptomatic.

== Signs and symptoms ==
When symptomatic, the disease classically begins with symptoms that are similar to a gout attack (thus the moniker pseudogout). These include:

- severe pain
- warmth
- swelling of one or more joints
- severe fatigue
- fever
- feeling of malaise or flu-like symptoms
- inability to walk or perform everyday tasks or hobbies
- gnawing/chewing sensations in the joints
- burning

The symptoms can be monoarticular (involving a single joint) or polyarticular (involving several joints). Symptoms usually last for days to weeks, and often recur. Although any joint may be affected, the knees, wrists, and hips are most common.

CPPD crystals appear as shattered glass under the microscope. When released into the synovial fluid, it causes unbearable pain to the patient.

Flares are sudden, severe and without warning. Diet does not appear to cause flares. Overexertion of any exercise, standing too long, shopping, stressful or loud environments, can or may lead to severe flares, which can last from one hour to months. Although, in some patient interviews, alcohol may be a known trigger.

X-ray, CT, or other imaging usually shows accumulation of calcium within the joint cartilage, known as chondrocalcinosis. There can also be findings of osteoarthritis. The white blood cell count is often raised.

== Cause ==
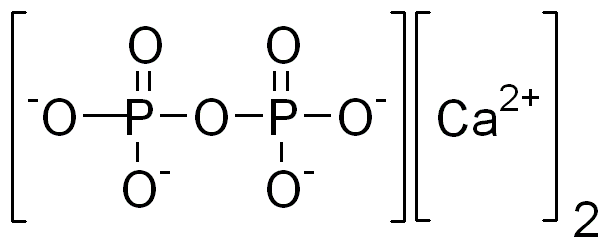
Calcium pyrophosphate

The cause of CPPD disease is unknown. Increased breakdown of adenosine triphosphate (ATP; the molecule used as energy currency in all living things), which results in increased pyrophosphate levels in joints, is thought to be one reason why crystals may develop.

Familial forms are rare. One genetic study found an association between CPPD and a region of chromosome 8q.

The gene ANKH is involved in crystal-related inflammatory reactions and inorganic phosphate transport.

Chrondocalcinosis may be extremely common in the population. CPPD flares may also be triggered by joint trauma from previous surgeries.

== Diagnosis ==
The disease is defined by presence of joint inflammation and the presence of CPPD crystals within the joint. The crystals are usually detected by imaging and/or joint fluid analysis.

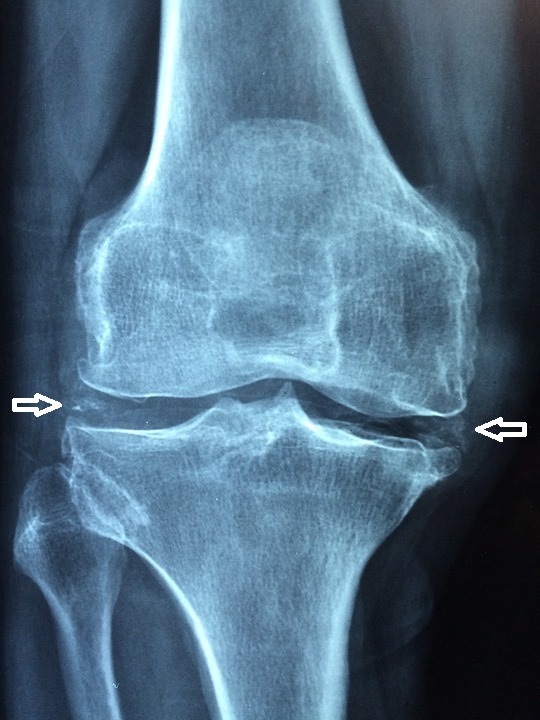
X-ray of a knee with chondrocalcinosis.

Medical imaging, consisting of x-ray, CT, MRI, or ultrasound may detect chondrocalcinosis within the affected joint, indicating a substantial amount of calcium crystal deposition within the cartilage or ligaments. Ultrasound is a reliable method to diagnose CPPD. Using ultrasound, chondrocalcinosis may be depicted as echogenic foci with no acoustic shadow within the hyaline cartilage or fibrocartilage. By x-ray, CPPD can appear similar to other diseases such as ankylosing spondylitis and gout.

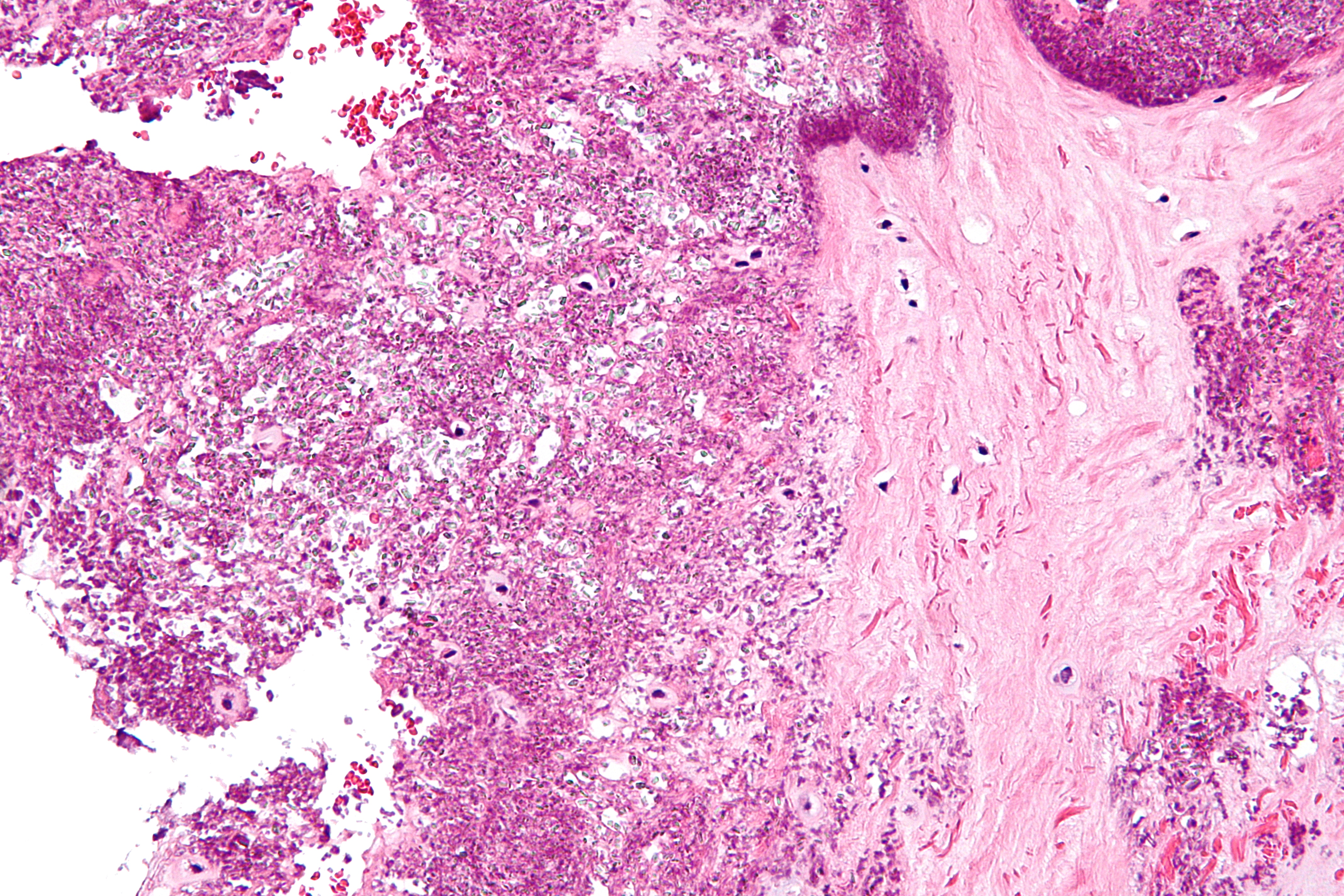
Micrograph showing crystal deposition in an intervertebral disc. H&E stain.

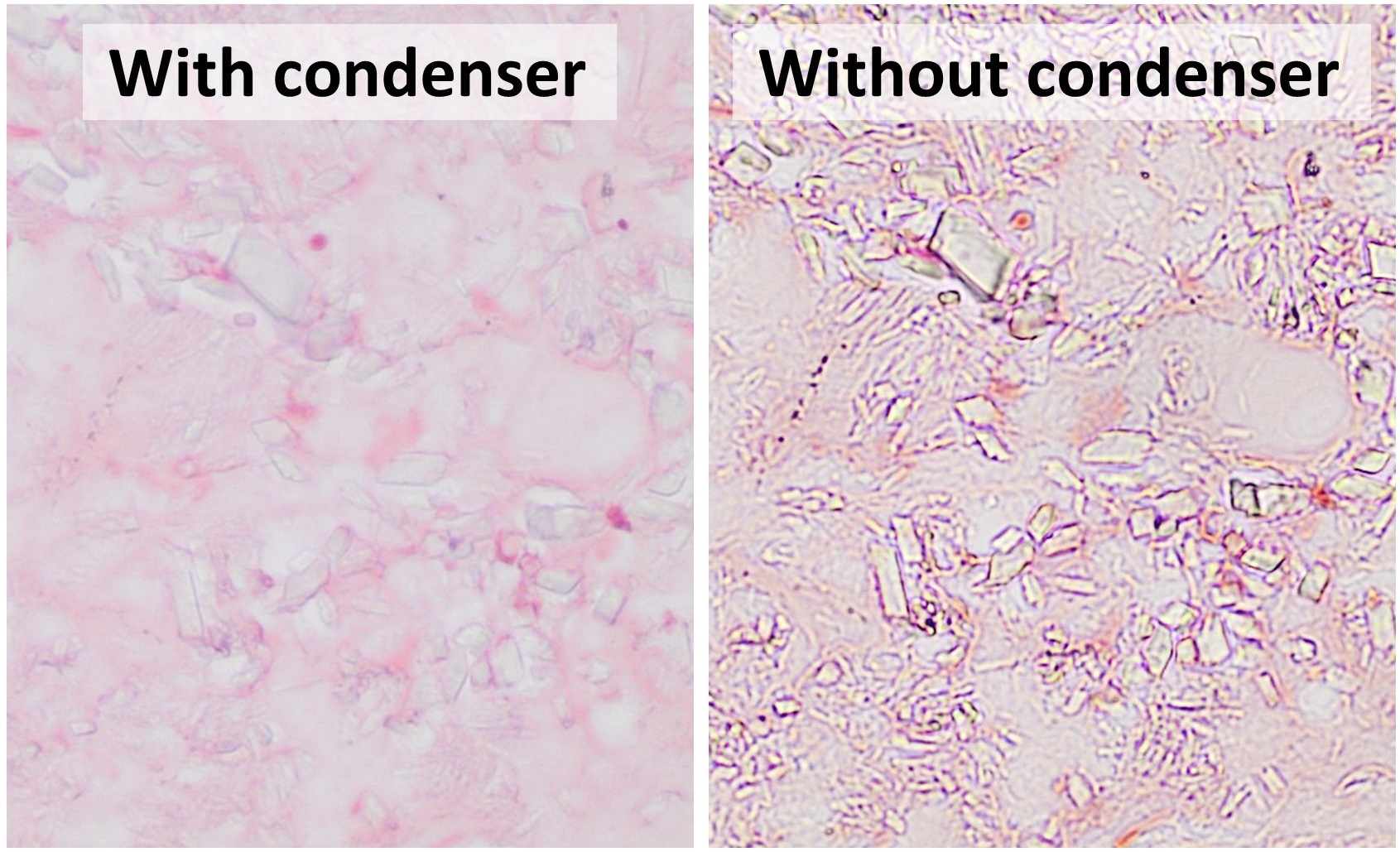
CPPD crystals are more clearly visualized on light microscopy without a condenser.

Arthrocentesis, or removing synovial fluid from the affected joint, is performed to test the synovial fluid for the calcium pyrophosphate crystals that are present in CPPD. When stained with H&E stain, calcium pyrophosphate crystals appears deeply blue ("basophilic"). However, CPP crystals are much better known for their rhomboid shape and weak positive birefringence on polarized light microscopy, and this method remains the most reliable method of identifying the crystals under the microscope. However, even this method has poor sensitivity, specificity, and inter-operator agreement.

These two modalities currently define CPPD disease, but lack diagnostic accuracy. Thus, the diagnosis of CPPD disease is potentially epiphenomenological.

== Treatment ==
Because any medication that could reduce the inflammation of CPPD bears a risk of causing organ damage, treatment is not advised if the condition is not causing pain. For acute pseudogout, treatments include intra-articular corticosteroid injection, systemic corticosteroids, non-steroidal anti-inflammatory drugs (NSAIDs), or, on occasion, high-dose colchicine. In general, NSAIDs are administered in low doses to help prevent CPPD. However, if an acute attack is already occurring, higher doses are administered. If nothing else works, hydroxychloroquine or methotrexate may provide relief. Research into surgical removal of calcifications is underway, however, this still remains an experimental procedure.

NSAIDs, colchicine, and methotrexate may provide initial relief. There is currently no treatment for non-invasive removal of these crystals once they are deposited. Attempts to dissolve crystals in situ using enzymes turned up to be a "clinical failure". New, innovative methods using catalytic peptides are in development.

== Epidemiology ==
The condition is more common in older adults.

CPPD is estimated to affect 4% to 7% of the adult populations of Europe and the United States. Previous studies have overestimated the prevalence by simply estimating the prevalence of chondrocalcinosis, which is found in many other conditions as well.

It may cause considerable pain, but it is never fatal. Women are at a slightly higher risk than men, with an estimated ratio of occurrence of 1.4:1.

== History ==
CPPD crystal deposition disease was originally described over 50 years ago.

== Terminology ==
Calcium pyrophosphate dihydrate crystals are associated with a range of clinical syndromes, which have been given various names, based upon which clinical symptoms or radiographic findings are most prominent. A task force of the European League Against Rheumatism (EULAR) made recommendations on preferred terminology. Accordingly, calcium pyrophosphate deposition (CPPD) is an umbrella term for the various clinical subsets, whose naming reflects an emphasis on particular features. For example, pseudogout refers to the acute symptoms of joint inflammation or synovitis: red, tender, and swollen joints that may resemble gouty arthritis (a similar condition in which monosodium urate crystals are deposited within the joints). Chondrocalcinosis, on the other hand, refers to the radiographic evidence of calcification in hyaline and/or fibrocartilage. "Osteoarthritis (OA) with CPPD" reflects a situation where osteoarthritis features are the most apparent. Pyrophosphate arthropathy refers to several of these situations.
