= Chondrocalcinosis =

Accumulation of calcium salts in joints

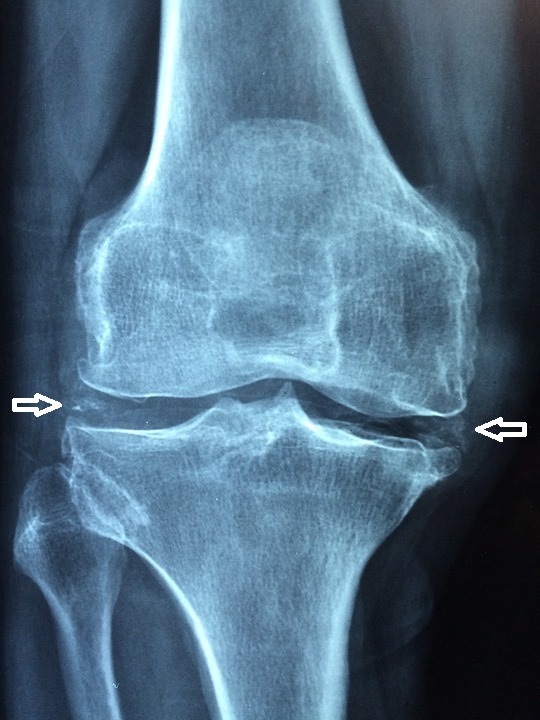
- X-ray of a knee with chondrocalcinosis
- Specialty: Radiology

Chondrocalcinosis or cartilage calcification is calcification (accumulation of calcium salts) in hyaline cartilage and/or fibrocartilage. Chondrocalcinosis is an observation that can be visualized through diagnostic imaging tests such as X-rays, CT, MRI, and ultrasound.

== Causes ==
Buildup of calcium phosphate in the ankle joints has been found in about 50% of the general population, and may be associated with osteoarthritis.

Another common cause of chondrocalcinosis is calcium pyrophosphate dihydrate crystal deposition disease (CPPD). CPPD is estimated to affect 4–7% of the adult populations of Europe and the United States. Chondrocalcinosis can be seen in approximately 40% of those with CPPD. Previous studies have overestimated the prevalence by simply estimating the prevalence of chondrocalcinosis regardless of cause.

A magnesium deficiency may cause chondrocalcinosis, and there is anecdotal evidence that magnesium supplementation may reduce or alleviate symptoms. In some cases, arthritis from injury can cause chondrocalcinosis. Other causes of chondrocalcinosis include:

- Hypercalcaemia, especially when caused by hyperparathyroidism
- Arthritis
- Pseudogout
- Wilson disease
- Hemochromatosis
- Ochronosis
- Hypophosphatasia
- Hypothyroidism
- Hyperoxalemia
- Acromegaly
- Gitelman syndrome

== Symptoms ==
Chondrocalcinosis does not always lead to symptoms. However, chondrocalcinosis in the presence of CPPD may cause symptoms similar to Pseudogout, Pseudo-rheumatoid arthritis, and Pseudo-osteoarthritis. Chondrocalcinosis may be accompanied by joint pain, joint swelling, and decreased range of motion.

== Chondrocalcinosis sites ==
Chondrocalcinosis affects common areas such as the knee, wrist, hand, and pelvis. Chondrocalcinosis can also be visualized affecting the spine. "Crowned Dens Syndrome" is an example of chondrocalcinosis affecting cervical vertebrae.

== Diagnosis ==
Chondrocalcinosis can be visualized on projectional radiography, CT scan, MRI, ultrasound, and nuclear medicine. CT scans and MRIs show calcific masses (usually within the ligamentum flavum or joint capsule), however radiography is more successful. At ultrasound, chondrocalcinosis may be depicted as echogenic foci with no acoustic shadow within the hyaline cartilage. As with most conditions, chondrocalcinosis can present with similarity to other diseases such as ankylosing spondylitis and gout.

== Genetics ==
More research is needed on the role of genetics in the development of chondrocalcinosis and CPPD, but there is some evidence that mutations of the ANKH gene may lead to chondrocalcinosis.
