= Synovitis =

Inflammation of the synovial membrane within a joint

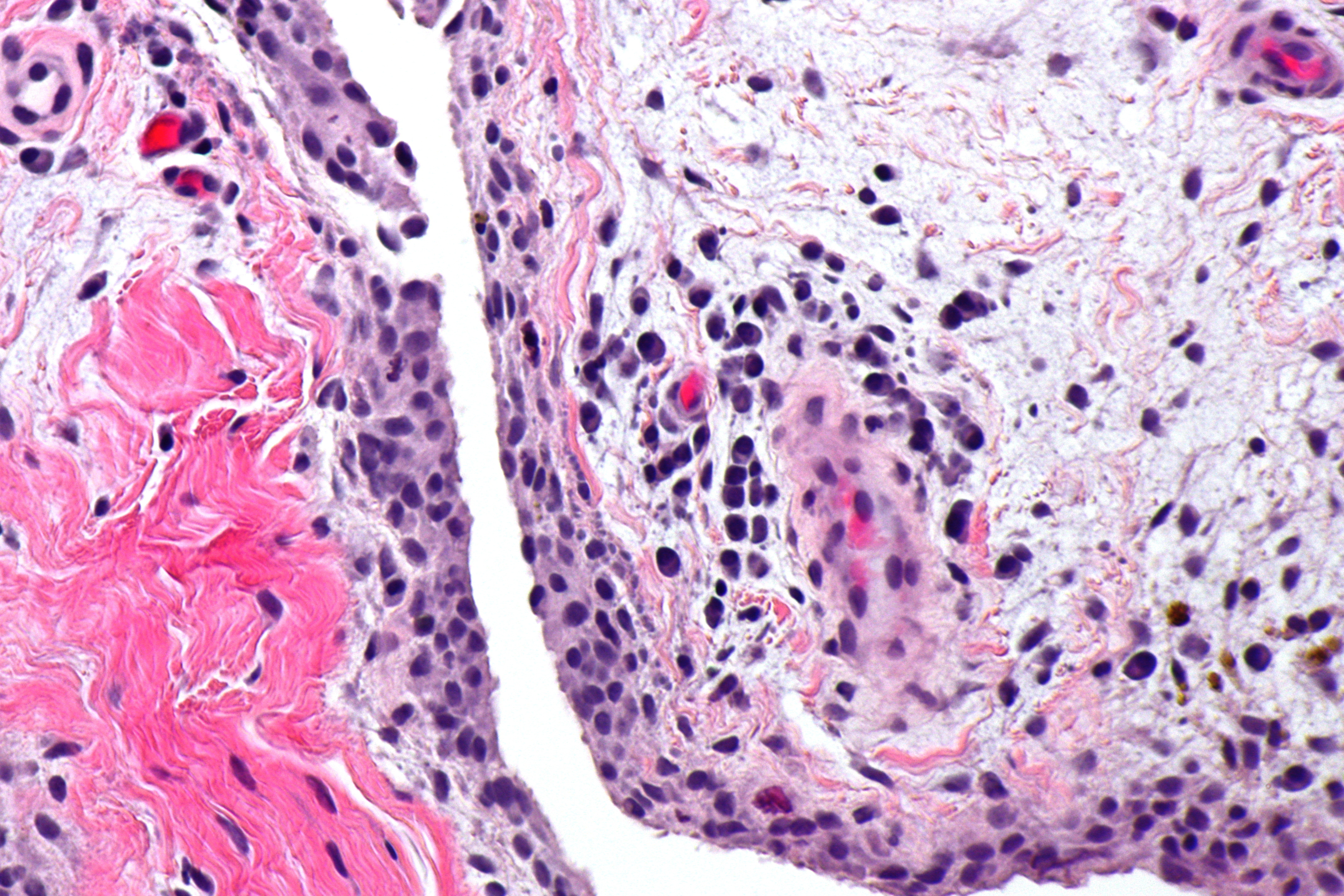
- Chronic synovitis
- Specialty: Rheumatology

Synovitis is the medical term for inflammation of the synovial membrane. This membrane lines joints that possess cavities, known as synovial joints. The condition is usually painful, particularly when the joint is moved. The joint usually swells due to synovial fluid collection.

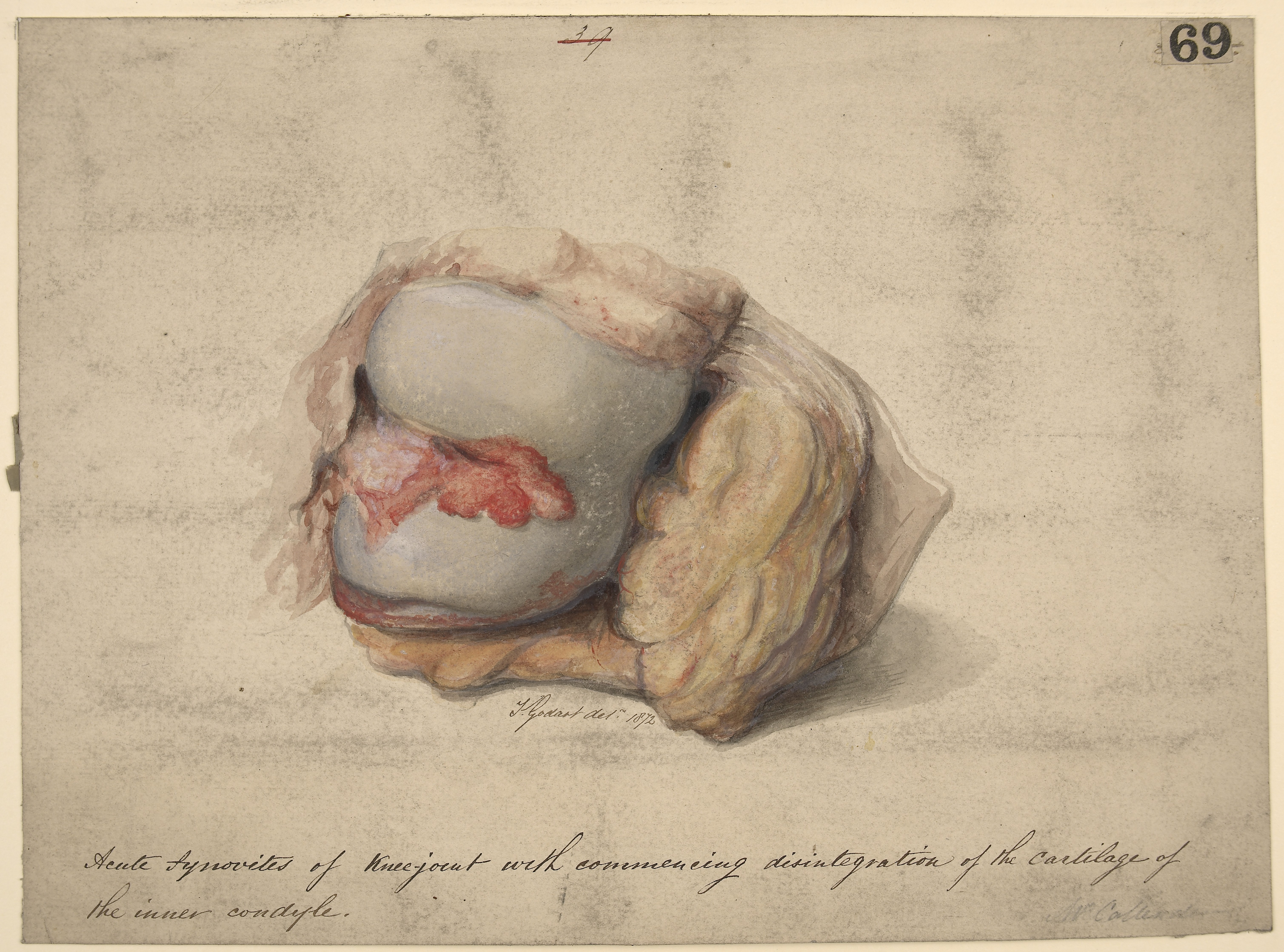
Watercolour drawing of acute synovitis of the knee joint, showing the beginnings of the disintegration of the cartilage of the internal condyle. Painted by Thomas Godart. Medical Photographic Library

Synovitis may occur in association with arthritis as well as lupus, gout, and other conditions. Synovitis is more commonly found in rheumatoid arthritis than in other forms of arthritis, and can thus serve as a distinguishing factor, although it is also present in many joints affected with osteoarthritis. In rheumatoid arthritis, the fibroblast-like synoviocytes, highly specialized mesenchymal cells found in the synovial membrane, play an active and prominent role in the synovitis. Long term occurrence of synovitis can result in degeneration of the joint.

== Signs and symptoms ==
Synovitis causes joint tenderness or pain, swelling and hard lumps, called nodules. When associated with rheumatoid arthritis, swelling is a better indicator than tenderness. The joints in your hands and fingers feel painful when pressed and when moving or gripping anything.

== Diagnosis ==
A rheumatologist will aim to diagnose the cause of the patient’s pain by first determining whether it is inside the joint itself, meaning true synovitis, or if it is actually caused by inflammation of the tendons, referred to as tendonitis. Imaging, such as an MRI or musculoskeletal ultrasound, is often required to make a firm diagnosis.

== Treatment ==
Synovitis symptoms can be treated with anti-inflammatory drugs such as NSAIDs. An injection of steroids may be done, directly into the affected joint. Injection of beta-emitting radioisotopes to locally treat synovitis has been performed in people for decades and is now being applied using tin-117m in veterinary medicine to treat canine elbow synovitis. Specific treatment depends on the underlying cause of the synovitis.

== See also ==
- Tenosynovitis
- Transient synovitis
- Knee effusion (water on the knee)
