= List of ICD-9 codes 800–999: injury and poisoning =

ICD-9 chapters
Chapter	Block	Title
I	001–139	Infectious and Parasitic Diseases
II	140–239	Neoplasms
III	240–279	Endocrine, Nutritional and Metabolic Diseases, and Immunity Disorders
IV	280–289	Diseases of the Blood and Blood-forming Organs
V	290–319	Mental Disorders
VI	320–389	Diseases of the Nervous System and Sense Organs
VII	390–459	Diseases of the Circulatory System
VIII	460–519	Diseases of the Respiratory System
IX	520–579	Diseases of the Digestive System
X	580–629	Diseases of the Genitourinary System
XI	630–679	Complications of Pregnancy, Childbirth, and the Puerperium
XII	680–709	Diseases of the Skin and Subcutaneous Tissue
XIII	710–739	Diseases of the Musculoskeletal System and Connective Tissue
XIV	740–759	Congenital Anomalies
XV	760–779	Certain Conditions originating in the Perinatal Period
XVI	780–799	Symptoms, Signs and Ill-defined Conditions
XVII	800–999	Injury and Poisoning
	E800–E999	Supplementary Classification of External Causes of Injury and Poisoning
	V01–V82	Supplementary Classification of Factors influencing Health Status and Contact with Health Services
	M8000–M9970	Morphology of Neoplasms

This is a shortened version of the seventeenth chapter of the ICD-9: Diseases of the Digestive System. It covers ICD codes 800 to 999. The full chapter can be found on pages 473 to 546 of Volume 1, which contains all (sub)categories of the ICD-9. Volume 2 is an alphabetical index of Volume 1. Both volumes can be downloaded for free from the website of the World Health Organization.

== Fracture of skull (800–804) ==
- 800 Fracture of vault of skull
- 801 Fracture of base of skull
- 802 Fracture of face bones
- 803 Other and unqualified skull fractures
- 804 Multiple fractures involving skull or face with other bones

== Fracture of neck and trunk (805–809) ==
- 805 Fracture of vertebral column without mention of spinal cord injury
- 806 Fracture of vertebral column with spinal cord injury
- 807 Fracture of rib(s), sternum, larynx, and trachea
- 808 Fracture of pelvis
- 809 Ill-defined fractures of bones of trunk

== Fracture of upper limb (810–819) ==
- 810 Fracture of clavicle
- 811 Fracture of scapula
- 812 Fracture of humerus
- 813 Fracture of radius and ulna
- 814 Fracture of carpal bone(s)
- 815 Fracture of metacarpal bone(s)
- 816 Fracture of one or more Phalanges of the hand
- 817 Multiple fractures of hand bones
- 818 Ill-defined fractures of upper limb
- 819 Multiple fractures involving both upper limbs, and upper limb with rib(s) and sternum

== Fracture of lower limb (820–829) ==
- 820 Fracture of neck of femur
- 821 Fracture of other and unspecified parts of femur
- 822 Fracture of patella
- 823 Fracture of tibia and fibula
- 824 Fracture of ankle
- 825 Fracture of one or more tarsal and metatarsal bones
- 826 Fracture of one or more phalanges of foot
- 827 Other, multiple, and ill-defined fractures of lower limb
- 828 Multiple fractures involving both lower limbs, lower with upper limb, and lower limb(s) with rib(s) and sternum
- 829 Fracture of unspecified bones

== Dislocation (830–839) ==
- 830 Dislocation of jaw
- 831 Dislocation of shoulder
- 832 Dislocation of elbow
- 833 Dislocation of wrist
- 834 Dislocation of finger
- 835 Dislocation of hip
- 836 Dislocation of knee
- 837 Dislocation of ankle
- 838 Dislocation of foot
- 839 Other, multiple, and ill-defined dislocations

== Sprains and strains of joints and adjacent muscles (840–848) ==
- 840 Sprains and strains of shoulder and upper arm
- 841 Sprains and strains of elbow and forearm
- 842 Sprains and strains of wrist and hand
- 843 Sprains and strains of hip and thigh
- 844 Sprains and strains of knee and leg
- 845 Sprains and strains of ankle and foot
- 846 Sprains and strains of sacroiliac region
- 847 Sprains and strains of other and unspecified parts of back
- 848 Other and ill-defined sprains and strains

== Intracranial injury, excluding those with skull fracture (850–854) ==
- 850 Concussion
- 851 Cerebral laceration and contusion
- 852 Subarachnoid, subdural, and extradural hemorrhage, following injury
- 853 Other and unspecified intracranial hemorrhage following injury
- 854 Intracranial injury of other and unspecified nature

== Internal injury of thorax, abdomen, and pelvis (860–869) ==
- 860 Traumatic pneumothorax and hemothorax
  - 860.0 Traumatic pneumothorax without open wound into thorax
  - 860.1 Traumatic pneumothorax with open wound into thorax
  - 860.2 Traumatic hemothorax without open wound into thorax
  - 860.3 Traumatic hemothorax with open wound into thorax
  - 860.4 Traumatic pneumohemothorax without open wound into thorax
  - 860.5 Traumatic pneumohemothorax with open wound into thorax
- 861 Injury to heart and lung
  - 861.0 Heart injury without mention of open wound into thorax
  - 861.1 Heart injury with open wound into thorax
  - 861.2 Lung injury without mention of open wound into thorax
    - 862.21 Injury to bronchus without open wound into cavity
    - 862.22 Injury to esophagus without open wound into cavity
  - 861.3 Lung injury with open wound into thorax
- 862 Injury to other and unspecified intrathoracic organs
  - 862.0 Injury to diaphragm without open wound into cavity
  - 862.1 Injury to diaphragm with open wound into cavity
  - 862.2 Injury to other specified intrathoracic organs without mention of open wound into cavity
  - 862.3 Injury to other specified intrathoracic organs with open wound into cavity
- 863 Injury to gastrointestinal tract
- 864 Injury to liver
- 865 Injury to spleen
- 866 Injury to kidney
- 867 Injury to pelvic organs
  - 867.0 Injury to bladder and urethra without open wound into cavity
  - 867.1 Injury to bladder and urethra with open wound into cavity
  - 867.2 Injury to ureter without open wound into cavity
  - 867.3 Injury to ureter with open wound into cavity
  - 867.4 Injury to uterus without open wound into cavity
  - 867.5 Injury to uterus with open wound into cavity
- 868 Injury to other intra-abdominal organs
  - 868.0 Injury to other intra-abdominal organs without mention of open wound into cavity
    - 868.00 Injury to unspecified intra-abdominal organ without open wound into cavity
    - 868.01 Injury to adrenal gland without open wound into cavity
    - 868.02 Injury to bile duct and gallbladder without open wound into cavity
    - 868.03 Injury to peritoneum without open wound into cavity
    - 868.04 Injury to retroperitoneum without open wound into cavity
    - 868.09 Injury to other and multiple intra-abdominal organs without open wound into cavity
  - 868.1 Injury to other intra-abdominal organs with open wound into cavity
- 869 Internal injury to unspecified or ill-defined organs

== Open wound of head, neck, and trunk (870–879) ==
- 870 Open wound of ocular adnexa
- 871 Open wound of eyeball
- 872 Open wound of ear
- 873 Other open wound of head
- 874 Open wound of neck
- 875 Open wound of chest (wall)
- 876 Open wound of back
- 877 Open wound of buttock
- 878 Open wound of genital organs (external), including traumatic amputation
- 879 Open wound of other and unspecified sites, except limbs

== Open wound of upper limb (880–887) ==
- 880 Open wound of shoulder and upper arm
- 881 Open wound of elbow, forearm, and wrist
- 882 Open wound of hand except finger(s) alone
- 883 Open wound of finger(s)
- 884 Multiple and unspecified open wound of upper limb
- 885 Traumatic amputation of thumb (complete) (partial)
- 886 Traumatic amputation of other finger(s) (complete) (partial)
- 887 Traumatic amputation of arm and hand (complete) (partial)

== Open wound of lower limb (890–897) ==
- 890 Open wound of hip and thigh
- 891 Open wound of knee, leg (except thigh), and ankle
- 892 Open wound of foot except toe(s) alone
- 893 Open wound of toe(s)
- 894 Multiple and unspecified open wound of lower limb
- 895 Traumatic amputation of toe(s)
- 896 Traumatic amputation of foot
- 897 Traumatic amputation of leg(s)

== Injury to blood vessels (900–904) ==
- 900 Injury to blood vessels of head and neck
- 901 Injury to blood vessels of thorax
- 902 Injury to blood vessels of abdomen and pelvis
- 903 Injury to blood vessels of upper extremity
- 904 Injury to blood vessels of lower extremity and unspecified sites

== Late effects of injuries, poisonings, toxic effects, and other external causes (905–909) ==
- 905 Late effects of musculoskeletal and connective tissue injuries
- 906 Late effects of injuries to skin and subcutaneous tissues
- 907 Late effects of injuries to the nervous system
- 908 Late effects of other and unspecified injuries
- 909 Late effects of other and unspecified external causes

== Superficial injury (910–919) ==
- 910 Superficial injury of face, neck, and scalp except eye
- 911 Superficial injury of trunk
- 912 Superficial injury of shoulder and upper arm
- 913 Superficial injury of elbow, forearm, and wrist
- 914 Superficial injury of hand(s) except finger(s) alone
- 915 Superficial injury of finger(s)
- 916 Superficial injury of hip, thigh, leg, and ankle
- 917 Superficial injury of foot and toe(s)
- 918 Superficial injury of eye and adnexa
- 919 Superficial injury of other, multiple, and unspecified sites
  - 919.0 Abrasion or friction burn of other multiple and unspecified sites without infection
  - 919.1 Abrasion or friction burn of other multiple and unspecified sites infected
  - 919.2 Blister of other multiple and unspecified sites without infection
  - 919.3 Blister of other multiple and unspecified sites infected
  - 919.4 Insect bite nonvenomous of other multiple and unspecified sites without infection
  - 919.5 Insect bite nonvenomous of other multiple and unspecified sites infected
  - 919.6 Superficial foreign body (splinter) of other multiple and unspecified sites without major open wound and without infection
  - 919.7 Superficial foreign body (splinter) of other multiple and unspecified sites without major open wound infected
  - 919.8 Other and unspecified superficial injury of other multiple and unspecified sites without infection
  - 919.9 Other and unspecified superficial injury of other multiple and unspecified sites infected

== Contusion with intact skin surface (920–924) ==
- 920 Contusion of face, scalp, and neck except eye(s)
- 921 Contusion of eye and adnexa
  - 921.0 Black eye not otherwise specified
- 922 Contusion of trunk
- 923 Contusion of upper limb
  - 923.3 Contusion of finger
- 924 Contusion of lower limb and of other and unspecified sites
  - 924.3 Contusion of toe

== Crushing injury (925–929) ==
- 925 Crushing injury of face, scalp, and neck
- 926 Crushing injury of trunk
- 927 Crushing injury of upper limb
- 928 Crushing injury of lower limb
- 929 Crushing injury of multiple and unspecified sites

== Effects of foreign body entering through Body orifice (930–939) ==
- 930 Foreign body on external eye
- 931 Foreign body, ear
- 932 Foreign body, nose
- 933 Foreign body in pharynx and larynx
- 934 Foreign body in trachea, bronchus, and lung
- 935 Foreign body in mouth, esophagus, and stomach
- 936 Foreign body, intestine/colon
- 937 Foreign body, anus/rectum
- 938 Foreign body in digestive system, unspecified
- 939 Foreign body in genitourinary tract

== Burns (940–949) ==
- 940 Burn confined to eye and adnexa
- 941 Burn of face, head, and neck
- 942 Burn of trunk
- 943 Burn of upper limb, except wrist and hand
- 944 Burn of wrist(s) and hand(s)
- 945 Burn of lower limb(s)
- 946 Burns of multiple specified sites
- 947 Burn of internal organs
- 948 Burns classified according to extent of body surface involved
- 949 Burn, unspecified

== Injury to nerves and spinal cord (950–957) ==
- 950 Injury to optic nerve and pathways
- 951 Injury to other cranial nerve(s)
- 952 Spinal cord injury without evidence of spinal bone injury
- 953 Injury to nerve roots and spinal plexus
  - 953.0 Injury to cervical nerve root
  - 953.1 Injury to dorsal nerve root
  - 953.2 Injury to lumbar nerve root
  - 953.3 Injury to sacral nerve root
  - 953.4 Injury to brachial plexus
  - 953.5 Injury to lumbosacral plexus
  - 953.8 Injury to multiple sites of nerve roots and spinal plexus
  - 953.9 Injury to unspecified site of nerve roots and spinal plexus
- 954 Injury to other nerve(s) of trunk, excluding shoulder and pelvic girdles
- 955 Injury to nerve(s) of shoulder girdle and upper limb
  - 955.0 Injury to axillary nerve
  - 955.1 Injury to median nerve
  - 955.2 Injury to ulnar nerve
  - 955.3 Injury to radial nerve
  - 955.4 Injury to musculocutaneous nerve
  - 955.5 Injury to cutaneous sensory nerve upper limb
  - 955.6 Injury to digital nerve upper limb
  - 955.7 Injury to other specified nerve(s) of shoulder girdle and upper limb
  - 955.8 Injury to multiple nerves of shoulder girdle and upper limb
  - 955.9 Injury to unspecified nerve of shoulder girdle and upper limb
- 956 Injury to nerve(s) of pelvic girdle and lower limb
- 957 Injury to other and unspecified nerves

== Certain traumatic complications and unspecified injuries (958–959) ==
- 958 Certain early complications of Physical trauma
  - 958.0 Air embolism as an early complication of trauma
  - 958.1 Fat embolism as an early complication of trauma
  - 958.2 Secondary and recurrent hemorrhage as an early complication of trauma
  - 958.3 Posttraumatic wound infection not elsewhere classified
  - 958.4 Traumatic shock
  - 958.5 Traumatic anuria
  - 958.6 Volkmann's ischemic contracture
  - 958.7 Traumatic subcutaneous emphysema
  - 958.8 Other early complications of trauma
  - 958.9 Traumatic compartment syndrome
- 959 Injury, other and unspecified
  - 959.1 Other and unspecified injury to trunk
    - 959.13 Fracture of corpus cavernosum penis

== Poisoning by drugs, medicinal and biological substances (960–979) ==
- 960 Poisoning by antibiotics
- 961 Poisoning by other anti-infectives
- 962 Poisoning by hormones and synthetic substitutes
- 963 Poisoning by primarily systemic agents
- 964 Poisoning by agents primarily affecting blood constituents
- 965 Poisoning by analgesics, antipyretics, and antirheumatics
- 966 Poisoning by anticonvulsants and anti-Parkinsonism drugs
- 967 Poisoning by sedatives and hypnotics
- 968 Poisoning by other Central nervous system depressants and anesthetics
- 969 Poisoning by psychotropic agents
  - 969.0 Poisoning by antidepressants
  - 969.1 Poisoning by phenothiazine-based tranquilizers
  - 969.2 Poisoning by butyrophenone-based tranquilizers
  - 969.3 Poisoning by other antipsychotics neuroleptics and major tranquilizers
  - 969.4 Poisoning by benzodiazepine-based tranquilizers
  - 969.5 Poisoning by other tranquilizers
  - 969.6 Poisoning by psychodysleptics (hallucinogens)
  - 969.7 Poisoning by psychostimulants
  - 969.8 Poisoning by other specified psychotropic agents
  - 969.9 Poisoning by unspecified psychotropic agent
- 970 Poisoning by central nervous system stimulants
- 971 Poisoning by drugs primarily affecting the autonomic nervous system
- 972 Poisoning by agents primarily affecting the cardiovascular system
- 973 Poisoning by agents primarily affecting the gastrointestinal system
- 974 Poisoning by water, mineral, and uric acid metabolism drugs
- 975 Poisoning by agents primarily acting on the smooth and skeletal muscles and respiratory system
- 976 Poisoning by agents primarily affecting skin and mucous membrane, ophthalmological, otorhinolaryngological, and dental drugs
- 977 Poisoning by other and unspecified drugs and medicinal substances
- 978 Poisoning by bacterial vaccines
- 979 Poisoning by other vaccines and biological substances

== Toxic effects of substances chiefly nonmedicinal as to source (980–989) ==
- 980 Toxic effect of alcohol
  - 980.0 Toxic effect of ethyl alcohol
  - 980.1 Toxic effect of methyl alcohol
  - 980.2 Toxic effect of isopropyl alcohol
  - 980.3 Toxic effect of fusel oil
  - 980.8 Toxic effect of other specified alcohols
  - 980.9 Toxic effect of unspecified alcohol
- 981 Toxic effect of petroleum products
- 982 Toxic effect of solvents other than petroleum based
  - 982.0 Toxic effect of benzene and homologues
  - 982.1 Toxic effect of carbon tetrachloride
  - 982.2 Toxic effect of carbon disulfide
  - 982.3 Toxic effect of other chlorinated hydrocarbon solvents
  - 982.4 Toxic effect of nitroglycol
  - 982.8 Toxic effect of other nonpetroleum-based solvents
- 983 Toxic effect of corrosive aromatics, acids, and caustic alkalis
- 984 Toxic effect of lead and its compounds (including fumes)
- 985 Toxic effect of other metals
  - 985.0 Toxic effect of mercury and its compounds
  - 985.1 Toxic effect of arsenic and its compounds
  - 985.2 Toxic effect of manganese and its compounds
  - 985.3 Toxic effect of beryllium and its compounds
  - 985.4 Toxic effect of antimony and its compounds
  - 985.5 Toxic effect of cadmium and its compounds
  - 985.6 Toxic effect of chromium
  - 985.8 Toxic effect of other specified metals
  - 985.9 Toxic effect of unspecified metal
- 986 Poisoning, carbon monoxide
- 987 Toxic effect of other gases, fumes, or vapors
  - 987.0 Toxic effect of liquefied petroleum gas
  - 987.1 Toxic effect of other hydrocarbon gas
  - 987.2 Toxic effect of nitrogen oxides
  - 987.3 Toxic effect of sulfur dioxide
  - 987.4 Toxic effect of freon
  - 987.5 Toxic effect of lacrimogenic gas
  - 987.6 Toxic effect of chlorine gas
  - 987.7 Toxic effect of hydrocyanic acid gas
- 988 Toxic effect of noxious substances eaten as food
  - 988.0 Toxic effect of fish and shellfish eaten as food
  - 988.1 Toxic effect of mushrooms eaten as food
  - 988.2 Toxic effect of berries and other plants eaten as food
  - 988.8 Toxic effect of other specified noxious substances eaten as food
  - 988.9 Toxic effect of unspecified noxious substance eaten as food
- 989 Toxic effect of other substances, chiefly nonmedicinal as to source
  - 989.0 Hydrocyanic acid and cyanides
  - 989.1 Strychnine and salts
  - 989.2 Chlorinated hydrocarbons
  - 989.3 Organophosphate and carbamate
  - 989.4 Other pesticides, not elsewhere classified
  - 989.5 Venom
    - Bites of venomous snakes, lizards, and spiders
    - Tick paralysis
  - 989.6 Soaps and detergents
  - 989.7 Aflatoxin and other mycotoxin (food contaminants)
  - 989.8 Other substances, chiefly nonmedicinal as to source
  - 989.9 Unspecified substance, chiefly nonmedicinal as to source

== Other and unspecified effects of external causes (990–995) ==
- 990 Effects of radiation, unspecified
- 991 Effects of reduced temperature
  - 991.3 Frostbite, unspec./other
  - 991.5 Chilblains
  - 991.6 Hypothermia
- 992 Effects of heat and light
  - 992.0 Heat stroke
  - 992.3 Heat exhaustion
- 993 Effects of air pressure
  - 993.0 Barotrauma, otitic
- 994 Effects of other external causes
  - 994.0 Effects of lightning
  - 994.1 Drowning and nonfatal submersion
  - 994.2 Effects of neoplasms
  - 994.3 Effects of thirst
  - 994.4 Exhaustion due to exposure
  - 994.5 Exhaustion due to excessive exertion
  - 994.6 Motion sickness
  - 994.7 Asphyxiation and strangulation
  - 994.8 Electrocution and nonfatal effects of electric current
  - 994.9 Other effects of external causes
- 995 Certain adverse effects not elsewhere classified
  - 995.0 Anaphylaxis
  - 995.1 Angioneurotic edema
  - 995.2 Medication, adverse effects, unspec.
    - 995.20 Unspecified adverse effect of unspecified drug, medicinal and biological substance
    - 995.21 Arthus phenomenon
    - 995.22 Unspecified adverse effect of anesthesia
    - 995.23 Unspecified adverse effect of insulin
    - 995.27 Other drug allergy
    - 995.29 Unspecified adverse effect of other drug, medicinal and biological substance
  - 995.3 Allergy, unspec.
  - 995.4 Shock due to anesthesia not elsewhere classified
  - 995.5 Child abuse, unspec.
    - 995.55 Shaken infant syndrome
  - 995.6 Anaphylactic shock due to adverse food reaction
    - 995.60 Anaphylactic shock due to unspecified food
    - 995.61 Anaphylactic shock due to peanuts
    - 995.62 Anaphylactic shock due to crustaceans
    - 995.63 Anaphylactic shock due to fruits and vegetables
    - 995.64 Anaphylactic shock due to tree nuts and seeds
    - 995.65 Anaphylactic shock due to fish
    - 995.66 Anaphylactic shock due to food additives
    - 995.67 Anaphylactic shock due to milk products
    - 995.68 Anaphylactic shock due to eggs
    - 995.69 Anaphylactic shock due to other specified food
  - 995.7 Other adverse food reactions not elsewhere classified
  - 995.8 Other specified adverse effects not elsewhere classified
    - 995.81 Adult physical abuse
      - Battered person syndrome
    - 995.82 Adult emotional/psychological abuse
    - 995.83 Adult sexual abuse
    - 995.86 Malignant hyperthermia
    - 995.89 Other specified adverse effects not elsewhere classified
  - 995.9 Systemic inflammatory response syndrome
    - 995.91 Sepsis

== Complications of surgical and medical care, not elsewhere classified (996–999) ==
- 996 Complications peculiar to certain specified procedures
- 997 Complications affecting specified body systems, not elsewhere classified
- 998 Other complications of procedures, NEC
- 999 Complications of medical care, not elsewhere classified
  - 999.1 Air embolism as a complication of medical care not elsewhere classified
  - 999.8 Other transfusion reaction not elsewhere classified
    - Postperfusion syndrome NEC
