= List of ICD-9 codes 780–799: symptoms, signs, and ill-defined conditions =

ICD-9 chapters
Chapter	Block	Title
I	001–139	Infectious and Parasitic Diseases
II	140–239	Neoplasms
III	240–279	Endocrine, Nutritional and Metabolic Diseases, and Immunity Disorders
IV	280–289	Diseases of the Blood and Blood-forming Organs
V	290–319	Mental Disorders
VI	320–389	Diseases of the Nervous System and Sense Organs
VII	390–459	Diseases of the Circulatory System
VIII	460–519	Diseases of the Respiratory System
IX	520–579	Diseases of the Digestive System
X	580–629	Diseases of the Genitourinary System
XI	630–679	Complications of Pregnancy, Childbirth, and the Puerperium
XII	680–709	Diseases of the Skin and Subcutaneous Tissue
XIII	710–739	Diseases of the Musculoskeletal System and Connective Tissue
XIV	740–759	Congenital Anomalies
XV	760–779	Certain Conditions originating in the Perinatal Period
XVI	780–799	Symptoms, Signs and Ill-defined Conditions
XVII	800–999	Injury and Poisoning
	E800–E999	Supplementary Classification of External Causes of Injury and Poisoning
	V01–V82	Supplementary Classification of Factors influencing Health Status and Contact with Health Services
	M8000–M9970	Morphology of Neoplasms

This is a shortened version of the sixteenth chapter of the ICD-9: Symptoms, Signs and Ill-defined Conditions. It covers ICD codes 780 to 799. The full chapter can be found on pages 455 to 471 of Volume 1, which contains all (sub)categories of the ICD-9. Volume 2 is an alphabetical index of Volume 1. Both volumes can be downloaded for free from the website of the World Health Organization.

== Symptoms (780–789) ==
- 780 General symptoms
  - 780.0 Alteration of consciousness
    - 780.01 Coma
    - 780.02 Transient alteration of awareness
    - 780.03 Persistent vegetative state
    - 780.09 Semicoma, stupor
  - 780.1 Hallucinations
  - 780.2 Syncope
  - 780.3 Convulsions
    - 780.31 Febrile convulsions
    - 780.32 Complex febrile convulsions
    - 780.39 Other convulsions
  - 780.4 Dizziness/vertigo, NOS
  - 780.5 Sleep disturbance, unspec.
    - 780.50 Unspecified sleep disturbance
    - 780.51 Insomnia with sleep apnea, unspecified
    - 780.52 Insomnia, unspecified
    - 780.53 Hypersomnia with sleep apnea, unspecified
    - 780.54 Hypersomnia, unspecified
    - 780.55 Disruptions of 24-hour sleep-wake cycle, unspecified
    - 780.56 Dysfunctions associated with sleep stages or arousal from sleep
    - 780.57 Unspecified sleep apnea
    - 780.58 Sleep related movement disorder, unspecified
    - 780.59 Other sleep disturbances
  - 780.6 Fever, nonperinatal
  - 780.7 Malaise and fatigue
    - 780.71 Chronic fatigue syndrome
    - 780.72 Functional quadriplegia
    - 780.79 Other malaise and fatigue
  - 780.8 Sweating, excessive
  - 780.9 Other general symptoms
    - 780.91 Fussy infant
    - 780.92 Crying, infant, excessive
    - 780.93 Memory loss
    - 780.94 Early satiety
    - 780.95 Other excessive crying
    - 780.96 Generalized pain
    - 780.97 Altered mental status
    - 780.99 Other general symptoms
- 781 Symptoms involving nervous and musculoskeletal systems
  - 781.0 Abnormal involuntary movements
  - 781.1 Disturbances, smell and taste
  - 781.2 Gait abnormality
  - 781.3 Lack of coordination
    - Dysdiadochokinesia
    - Ataxia NOS
    - Hypotonia
  - 781.5 Clubbing of fingers
  - 781.8 Neurologic neglect syndrome
  - 781.9 Other symptoms involving nervous and musculoskeletal systems
    - 781.91 Loss of height
    - 781.92 Abnormal posture
    - 781.94 Facial weakness
- 782 Symptoms involving skin and other integumentary tissue
  - 782.0 Sensory disturbance skin
  - 782.1 Rash, nonvesicular, unspec.
  - 782.2 Localized swelling/mass, superficial
  - 782.3 Edema, localized, NOS
  - 782.4 Jaundice
  - 782.5 Cyanosis
  - 782.7 Petechiae
  - 782.8 Change in skin texture
  - 782.9 Other symptoms involving skin
- 783 Symptoms concerning nutrition, metabolism and development
  - 783.0 Anorexia
    - Loss of appetite
  - 783.1 Abnormal weight gain
  - 783.2 Abnormal loss of weight
  - 783.3 Feeding difficulties and mismanagement
  - 783.4 Lack of expected normal physiological development
  - 783.5 Polydipsia
  - 783.6 Polyphagia
  - 783.9 Other
- 784 Symptoms involving head and neck
  - 784.0 Headache
  - 784.1 Throat pain
  - 784.2 Swelling mass or lump in head and neck
  - 784.3 Aphasia
  - 784.4 Voice disturbance
    - 784.41 Aphonia
    - 784.49 Hoarseness
  - 784.5 Dysarthria
  - 784.6 Other symbolic dysfunction
    - 784.60 Symbolic dysfunction, unspecified
    - 784.61 Alexia and dyslexia
  - 784.7 Epistaxis
  - 784.8 Hemorrhage from throat
  - 784.9 Other symptoms involving head and neck
    - 784.91 Postnasal drip
- 785 Symptoms involving cardiovascular system
  - 785.0 Tachycardia
  - 785.1 Palpitations
  - 785.2 Murmur of heart, undiagnosed
  - 785.3 Other abnormal heart sounds
  - 785.4 Gangrene
  - 785.5 Shock, unspec.
    - 785.50 Shock unspecified
    - 785.51 Cardiogenic shock
    - 785.52 Septic shock
  - 785.6 Enlarged lymph nodes
  - 785.9 Bruit
- 786 Symptoms involving respiratory system and other chest symptoms
  - 786.0 Dyspnea and respiratory abnormalities
    - 786.03 Apnea
    - 786.04 Cheyne-Stokes respiration
    - 786.05 Shortness of breath
    - 786.06 Tachypnea
    - 786.07 Wheezing
    - 786.09 Other respiratory abnormalities
      - Bradypnea
  - 786.1 Stridor
  - 786.2 Cough
  - 786.3 Hemoptysis
  - 786.4 Abnormal sputum
  - 786.5 Chest pain, unspec.
    - 786.51 Precordial pain
    - 786.52 Pleuritic pain
  - 786.6 swelling, mass, or lump in chest
  - 786.7 Abnormal chest sounds
    - Rales
  - 786.8 Hiccoughs
- 787 Symptoms involving digestive system
  - 787.0 Nausea and vomiting
    - 787.01 Nausea w/vomiting
    - 787.02 Nausea, alone
    - 787.03 Vomiting, alone
  - 787.1 Heartburn
  - 787.2 Dysphagia
  - 787.3 Gas/bloating
  - 787.4 Visible peristalsis
  - 787.5 Abnormal bowel sounds
  - 787.6 Encopresis, NOS, fecal incontinence
  - 787.9 Other symptoms involving digestive system
    - 787.91 Diarrhea, NOS
- 788 Symptoms involving urinary system
  - 788.0 Renal colic
  - 788.1 Dysuria
  - 788.2 Retention of urine
  - 788.3 Urinary incontinence
    - 788.30 Urinary incontinence unspecified
    - 788.31 Urge incontinence
    - 788.32 Stress incontinence
    - 788.33 Mixed incontinence
    - 788.34 Incontinence without sensory awareness
    - 788.35 Post-void dribbling
    - 788.36 Nocturnal enuresis
    - 788.37 Continuous leakage
    - 788.38 Overflow incontinence
    - 788.39 Other urinary incontinence
  - 788.4 Frequency of urination and polyuria
    - 788.41 Urinary frequency
    - 788.42 Polyuria
    - 788.43 Nocturia
  - 788.5 Oliguria and anuria
  - 788.6 Other abnormality of urination
    - 788.63 Urgency of urination
- 789 Other symptoms involving abdomen and pelvis
  - 789.0 Abdominal pain
  - 789.1 Hepatomegaly
  - 789.2 Splenomegaly
  - 789.3 Abdominal/pelvic mass, unspec.
  - 789.4 Abdominal rigidity
  - 789.5 Ascites
  - 789.6 Abdominal tenderness

== Nonspecific abnormal findings (790–796) ==
- 790 Nonspecific findings on examination of blood
- 790.0 Abnormal red blood cell
  - 790.1 Elevated sedimentation rate
  - 790.2 Abnormal glucose
    - 790.21 Impaired fasting glucose
    - 790.22 Impaired glucose tolerance test (oral)
    - 790.29 Other abnormal glucose
  - 790.3 Excessive blood level of alcohol
  - 790.4 Abnormal transaminase/LDH
  - 790.5 Other nonspecific abnormal serum enzyme levels
  - 790.6 Abnormal blood chemistry, other
    - Iron overload disorder
  - 790.7 Bacteremia (not septicemia)
  - 790.8 Viremia, unspecified
  - 790.9 Other nonspecific findings on examination of blood
    - 790.91 Abnormal arterial blood gases
    - 790.92 Abnormal coagulation profile
    - 790.93 Abnormal prostate specific antigen
    - 790.99 Other
      - Reticulocytosis
- 791 Nonspecific findings on examination of urine
  - 791.0 Proteinuria
    - Albuminuria
  - 791.2 Hemoglobinuria
  - 791.5 Glycosuria
- 792 Nonspecific abnormal findings in other body substances
  - 792.1 Blood in stool, occult
- 793 Nonspecific abnormal findings on radiological and other examination
  - 793.1 Abnormal X-ray, lung TERM: 9/30/11
  - 793.8 Mammogram, abnormal, unspec.
- 794 Nonspecific abnormal results of function studies
  - 794.1 Peripheral nervous system and special senses
    - 794.15 Abnormal auditory function study
  - 794.3 Cardiovascular
    - 794.31 Abnormal electrocardiogram
- 795 Nonspecific abnormal histological and immunological findings
  - 795.0 Nonspecific abnormal Papanicolaou smear of cervix
  - 795.5 Positive PPD TERM: 9/30/11
- 796 Other nonspecific abnormal findings
  - 796.2 Elevated BP w/o hypertension

== Ill-defined and unknown causes of morbidity and mortality (797–799) ==
- 797 Senility without mention of psychosis
- 798 Sudden death, cause unknown
- 798 Sudden infant death syndrome
- 799 Other ill-defined and unknown causes of morbidity and mortality
  - 799.0 Asphyxia
  - 799.1 Respiratory arrest
  - 799.2 Nervousness
  - 799.3 Debility
  - 799.4 Cachexia
  - 799.8 Other ill-defined conditions
    - 799.81 Decreased libido
    - 799.89 Other ill-defined conditions
