= List of ICD-9 codes 630–679: complications of pregnancy, childbirth, and the puerperium =

ICD-9 chapters
Chapter	Block	Title
I	001–139	Infectious and Parasitic Diseases
II	140–239	Neoplasms
III	240–279	Endocrine, Nutritional and Metabolic Diseases, and Immunity Disorders
IV	280–289	Diseases of the Blood and Blood-forming Organs
V	290–319	Mental Disorders
VI	320–389	Diseases of the Nervous System and Sense Organs
VII	390–459	Diseases of the Circulatory System
VIII	460–519	Diseases of the Respiratory System
IX	520–579	Diseases of the Digestive System
X	580–629	Diseases of the Genitourinary System
XI	630–679	Complications of Pregnancy, Childbirth, and the Puerperium
XII	680–709	Diseases of the Skin and Subcutaneous Tissue
XIII	710–739	Diseases of the Musculoskeletal System and Connective Tissue
XIV	740–759	Congenital Anomalies
XV	760–779	Certain Conditions originating in the Perinatal Period
XVI	780–799	Symptoms, Signs and Ill-defined Conditions
XVII	800–999	Injury and Poisoning
	E800–E999	Supplementary Classification of External Causes of Injury and Poisoning
	V01–V82	Supplementary Classification of Factors influencing Health Status and Contact with Health Services
	M8000–M9970	Morphology of Neoplasms

This is a shortened version of the eleventh chapter of the ICD-9: Complications of Pregnancy, Childbirth, and the Puerperium. It covers ICD codes 630 to 679. The full chapter can be found on pages 355 to 378 of Volume 1, which contains all (sub)categories of the ICD-9. Volume 2 is an alphabetical index of Volume 1. Both volumes can be downloaded for free from the website of the World Health Organization.

== Ectopic and molar pregnancy (630–633) ==
- 630 Hydatidiform mole
- 631 Other abnormal product of conception
- 632 Abortion, missed
  - 633.1 Ectopic pregnancy, tubal, no IUP
  - 633.9 Ectopic pregnancy, no IUP, unspec.

== Other pregnancy with abortive outcome (634–639) ==
- 634 Spontaneous abortion
- 635 Legally induced abortion
- 636 Illegally induced abortion
- 637 Unspecified abortion
- 638 Failed attempted abortion
- 639 Complications following abortion and ectopic and molar pregnancies

== Complications mainly related to pregnancy (640–649) ==
- 640 Hemorrhage in early pregnancy
  - 640.0 Threatened abortion
    - 640.03 Abortion, threatened, antepartum
- 641 Antepartum hemorrhage, abruptio placentae, and placenta previa
  - 641.0 Placenta previa, w/o bleeding, unspec.
  - 641.1 Placenta previa, w/ bleeding, unspec.
  - 641.2 Abruptio placentae, unspec.
  - 641.9 Hemorrhage in pregnancy., unspec.
- 642 Hypertension complicating pregnancy, childbirth, and the puerperium
  - 642.0 Benign essential hypertension complicating pregnancy childbirth and the puerperium
  - 642.1 Hypertension secondary to renal disease complicating pregnancy childbirth and the puerperium
  - 642.2 Other pre-existing hypertension complicating pregnancy childbirth and the puerperium
  - 642.3 Transient hypertension of pregnancy
    - 642.33 Gestational hypertension, antepartum
  - 642.4 Mild or unspecified pre-eclampsia
  - 642.5 Severe pre-eclampsia
  - 642.6 Eclampsia, unspec.
  - 642.7 Pre-eclampsia or eclampsia superimposed on pre-existing hypertension
- 643 Excessive vomiting in pregnancy
  - 643.0 Mild hyperemesis gravidarum
  - 643.1 Hyperemesis gravidarum with metabolic disturbance
  - 643.9 Vomiting of pregnancy, unspec.
- 644 Early or threatened labor
  - 644.0 Threatened premature labor
  - 644.1 Other threatened labor
  - 644.2 Early onset of delivery
- 645 Prolonged pregnancy
  - 645.1 Post term pregnancy
  - 645.2 Prolonged pregnancy
- 646 Other complications of pregnancy, not elsewhere classified
  - 646.0 Papyraceous fetus
  - 646.1 Edema or excessive weight gain in pregnancy without mention of hypertension
  - 646.2 Unspecified renal disease in pregnancy without mention of hypertension
  - 646.3 Habitual aborter currently pregnant
  - 646.4 Peripheral neuritis in pregnancy
  - 646.5 Asymptomatic bacteriuria in pregnancy
  - 646.6 Infections of genitourinary tract in pregnancy
  - 646.7 Liver disorders in pregnancy
- 647 Infective and parasitic conditions in the mother classifiable
  - 647.0 Syphilis complicating pregnancy childbirth or the puerperium
  - 647.1 Gonorrhea complicating pregnancy childbirth or the puerperium
  - 647.2 Other venereal diseases complicating pregnancy childbirth or the puerperium
  - 647.3 Tuberculosis complicating pregnancy childbirth or the puerperium
  - 647.4 Malaria complicating pregnancy childbirth or the puerperium
  - 647.5 Rubella complicating pregnancy childbirth or the puerperium
  - 647.6 Other viral diseases complicating pregnancy childbirth or the puerperium
- 648 Other current conditions in the mother classifiable elsewhere
  - 648.0 Diabetes mellitus complicating pregnancy childbirth or the puerperium
  - 648.1 Thyroid dysfunction complicating pregnancy childbirth or the puerperium
  - 648.2 Anemia complicating pregnancy childbirth or the puerperium
  - 648.3 Drug dependence complicating pregnancy childbirth or the puerperium
  - 648.4 Mental disorders complicating pregnancy childbirth or the puerperium
  - 648.5 Congenital cardiovascular disorders complicating pregnancy childbirth or the puerperium
  - 648.6 Other cardiovascular diseases complicating pregnancy childbirth or the puerperium
  - 648.7 Bone and joint disorders of back pelvis and lower limbs of mother complicating pregnancy childbirth or the puerperium
  - 648.8 Abnormal glucose tolerance of mother complicating pregnancy childbirth or the puerperium
    - 648.83 Gestational diabetes, antepartum
  - 648.9 Other current conditions complicating pregnancy childbirth or the puerperium
- 649 Other conditions or status of the mother complicating pregnancy, childbirth, or the puerperium
  - 649.0 Tobacco use disorder complicating pregnancy, childbirth, or the puerperium
  - 649.1 Obesity complicating pregnancy, childbirth, or the puerperium
  - 649.2 Bariatric surgerystatus complicating pregnancy, childbirth, or the puerperium
  - 649.3 Coagulation defects complicating pregnancy, childbirth, or the puerperium
  - 649.4 Epilepsy complicating pregnancy, childbirth, or the puerperium
  - 649.5 Spotting complicating pregnancy
  - 649.6 Uterine size date discrepancy
  - 649.7 Cervical shortening

== Normal delivery, and other indications for care in pregnancy, labor, and delivery (650–659) ==
- 650 Normal delivery
- 651 Multiple gestation
  - 651.0 Twins, unspec.
  - 651.1 Triplets, unspec.
- 652 Malposition and malpresentation of fetus
- 653 Disproportion
- 654 Abnormality of organs and soft tissues of pelvis
- 655 Known or suspected fetal abnormality affecting management of mother
    - 655.73 Fetal movements, decreased, antepartum
- 656 Other fetal and placental problems affecting management of mother
  - 656.0 Fetal-maternal hemorrhage affecting management of mother
    - 656.11 Rh incompatibility, delivered
    - 656.31 Fetal distress, delivered
    - 656.53 Small-for-dates, antepartum
    - 656.61 Large-for-dates, delivered
- 657 Polyhydramnios
- 658 Other problems associated with amniotic cavity and membranes
  - 658.0 Oligohydramnios
    - 658.03 Oligohydramnios, antepartum
  - 658.1 Premature rupture of membrane, unspec.
  - 658.8 Other problems associated with amniotic cavity and membranes
    - Amniotic band syndrome
- 659 Other indications for care or intervention related to labor
  - 659.1 Induction of labor, failed
  - 659.7 Abnormality in fetal heart rate/rhythm

== Complications occurring mainly in the course of labor and delivery (660–669) ==
- 660 Obstructed labor
    - 660.01 Obstruction, malposition, delivered
    - 660.11 Obstruction, bony pelvis, delivered
    - 660.41 Shoulder dystocia, delivered
    - 660.51 Locked twins, delivered
    - 660.61 Trial of labor, failed, delivered
- 661 Abnormality of forces of labor
  - 661.0 Uterine inertia, primary, unspec.
  - 661.1 Uterine inertia, secondary, unspec.
  - 661.3 Labor, precipitate, unspec.
- 662 Long labor
  - 662.1 Labor, prolonged, unspec.
- 663 Umbilical cord complications
  - 663.1 Cord around neck, unspec.
  - 663.3 Cord entanglement, other and unspec.
- 664 Trauma to perineum and vulva during delivery
    - 664.04 Laceration, perineal, 1st deg., postpartum
    - 664.14 Laceration, perineal, 2nd deg., postpartum
    - 664.24 Laceration, perineal, 3rd deg., postpartum
    - 664.34 Laceration, perineal, 4th deg., postpartum
- 665 Other obstetrical trauma
  - 665.3 Laceration of cervix, unspec.
- 666 Postpartum hemorrhage
    - 666.04 Hemorrhage, 3rd stage, postpartum
    - 666.14 Hemorrhage, other immediate postpartum
- 667 Retained placenta or membranes, without hemorrhage
- 668 Complication (medicine) of the administration of anesthetic or other sedation in labor (childbirth) and delivery
- 669 Complication (medicine) Other complications of labor and delivery, not elsewhere classified
  - 669.5 Forceps delivery or vacuum extractor delivery without mention of indication
    - 669.51 Forceps/vacuum extractor delivery, delivered, with or without mention of antepartum condition
    - 669.7 Cesarean delivery without mention of indication
    - 669.70 Cesarean delivery without indication unspecified as to episode of care
    - 669.71 Cesarean delivery without indication delivered with or without antepartum condition
  - 669.8 Other Complication (medicine) of labor (childbirth) and delivery
  - 669.9 Complicated delivery/labor, unspec.

== Complications of the puerperium (670–677) ==
- 670 Major puerperal infection
    - 670.04 Endometritis, postpartum
- 671 Venous complications in pregnancy and the puerperium
    - 671.44 Thrombophlebitis, postpartum
- 672 Pyrexia of unknown origin during the puerperium
- 673 Obstetrical pulmonary embolism
- 674 Other and unspecified complications of the puerperium, not elsewhere
- 675 Infections of the breast and nipple associated with childbirth
    - 675.14 Abscess of breast, postpartum
    - 675.94 Mastitis, lactating, unspec., postpartum
- 676 Other disorders of the breast associated with childbirth
    - 676.24 Engorgement of breasts, postpartum
- 677 Late effect of complication of pregnancy, childbirth, and the puerperium

== Other maternal and fetal complications (678–679) ==
- 678 Other fetal conditions
  - 678.0 Fetal hematologic conditions
  - 678.1 Fetal conjoined twins
- 679.02 Complications of in utero procedures
