= List of ICD-9 codes 140–239: neoplasms =

ICD-9 chapters
Chapter	Block	Title
I	001–139	Infectious and Parasitic Diseases
II	140–239	Neoplasms
III	240–279	Endocrine, Nutritional and Metabolic Diseases, and Immunity Disorders
IV	280–289	Diseases of the Blood and Blood-forming Organs
V	290–319	Mental Disorders
VI	320–389	Diseases of the Nervous System and Sense Organs
VII	390–459	Diseases of the Circulatory System
VIII	460–519	Diseases of the Respiratory System
IX	520–579	Diseases of the Digestive System
X	580–629	Diseases of the Genitourinary System
XI	630–679	Complications of Pregnancy, Childbirth, and the Puerperium
XII	680–709	Diseases of the Skin and Subcutaneous Tissue
XIII	710–739	Diseases of the Musculoskeletal System and Connective Tissue
XIV	740–759	Congenital Anomalies
XV	760–779	Certain Conditions originating in the Perinatal Period
XVI	780–799	Symptoms, Signs and Ill-defined Conditions
XVII	800–999	Injury and Poisoning
	E800–E999	Supplementary Classification of External Causes of Injury and Poisoning
	V01–V82	Supplementary Classification of Factors influencing Health Status and Contact with Health Services
	M8000–M9970	Morphology of Neoplasms

This is a shortened version of the second chapter of the ICD-9: Neoplasms. It covers ICD codes 140 to 239. The full chapter can be found on pages 101 to 144 of Volume 1, which contains all (sub)categories of the ICD-9. Volume 2 is an alphabetical index of Volume 1. Both volumes can be downloaded for free from the website of the World Health Organization.

See here for a tabular overview of primary, secondary, in situ, and benign neoplasms.

== Malignant neoplasm of lip, oral cavity, and pharynx (140–149) ==
- 140 Malignant neoplasm of lip
- 141 Malignant neoplasm of tongue
- 142 Malignant neoplasm of major salivary glands
- 143 Malignant neoplasm of gum
- 144 Malignant neoplasm of floor of mouth
- 145 Malignant neoplasm of other and unspecified parts of mouth
- 146 Malignant neoplasm of oropharynx
- 147 Malignant neoplasm of nasopharynx
- 148 Malignant neoplasm of hypopharynx
- 149 Malignant neoplasm of other and ill-defined sites within the lip

== Malignant neoplasm of digestive organs and peritoneum (150–159) ==
- 150 Malignant neoplasm of esophagus
- 151 Malignant neoplasm of stomach
- 152 Malignant neoplasm of small intestine, including duodenum
- 153 Malignant neoplasm colon
- 154 Malignant neoplasm of rectum, rectosigmoid junction, and anus
- 155 Malignant neoplasm of liver and intrahepatic bile ducts
- 156 Malignant neoplasm of gallbladder and extrahepatic bile ducts
- 157 Malignant neoplasm of pancreas
- 158 Malignant neoplasm of retroperitoneum and peritoneum
- 159 Malignant neoplasm of other and ill-defined sites within the

== Malignant neoplasm of respiratory and intrathoracic organs (160–165) ==
- 160 Malignant neoplasm of nasal cavities, middle ear, and accessory sinuses
- 161 Malignant neoplasm of larynx
- 162 Malignant neoplasm of trachea, bronchus, and lung
  - 162.0 Trachea
  - 162.2 Main bronchus
  - 162.3 Upper lobe, bronchus or lung
  - 162.4 Middle lobe, bronchus or lung
  - 162.5 Lower lobe, bronchus or lung
  - 162.8 Other parts of bronchus or lung
  - 162.9 Bronchus and lung, unspecified
- 163 Malignant neoplasm of pleura
- 164 Malignant neoplasm of thymus, heart, and mediastinum
- 165 Malignant neoplasm of other and ill-defined sites within the respiratory system and intrathoracic organs

== Malignant neoplasm of bone, connective tissue, skin, and breast (170–175) ==
- 170 Malignant neoplasm of bone and articular cartilage
  - 170.9 Malignant neoplasm of bone and articular cartilage, site unspecified
    - Ewing's sarcoma
    - Osteosarcoma
    - Chondrosarcoma
- 171 Malignant neoplasm of connective and other soft tissue
  - Rhabdomyosarcoma
- 172 Malignant melanoma of skin
- 173 Other malignant neoplasm of skin
- 174 Malignant neoplasm of female breast
- 175 Malignant neoplasm of male breast

== Kaposi's sarcoma (176–176) ==
- 176 Kaposi's sarcoma
  - 176.0 Kaposi's sarcoma skin
  - 176.1 Kaposi's sarcoma soft tissue
  - 176.2 Kaposi's sarcoma palate
  - 176.3 Kaposi's sarcoma gastrointestinal sites
  - 176.4 Kaposi's sarcoma
  - 176.5 Kaposi's sarcoma lymph nodes
  - 176.8 Kaposi's sarcoma other specified sites
  - 176.9 Kaposi's sarcoma unspecified site

== Malignant neoplasm of genitourinary organs (179–189) ==
- 179 Malignant neoplasm of uterus, part unspecified
- 180 Malignant neoplasm of cervix uteri
- 181 Malignant neoplasm of placenta
- 182 Malignant neoplasm of body of uterus
  - 182.0 Corpus uteri, except isthmus
    - Endometrial cancer
- 183 Malignant neoplasm of ovary and other uterine adnexa
- 184 Malignant neoplasm of other and unspecified female genital organs
- 185 Malignant neoplasm of prostate
- 186 Malignant neoplasm of testis
- 187 Malignant neoplasm of penis and other male genital organs
- 188 Malignant neoplasm of bladder
- 189 Malignant neoplasm of kidney and other and unspecified urinary organs
  - 189.0 Kidney, except pelvis
    - Renal cell carcinoma

== Malignant neoplasm of other and unspecified sites (190–199) ==
- 190 Malignant neoplasm of eye
- 191 Malignant neoplasm of brain
- 192 Malignant neoplasm of other and unspecified parts of nervous system
  - 192.0 Cranial nerve
  - 192.1 Cerebral meninges
    - Meningioma
  - 192.2 Spinal cord
  - 192.3 Spinal meninges
- 193 Malignant neoplasm of thyroid gland
- 194 Malignant neoplasm of other endocrine glands and related structures
- 195 Malignant neoplasm of other and ill-defined sites
- 196 Secondary and unspecified malignant neoplasm of lymph nodes
- 197 Secondary malignant neoplasm of respiratory and digestive systems
- 198 Secondary malignant neoplasm of other specified sites
- 199 Malignant neoplasm without specification of site

== Malignant neoplasm of lymphatic and hematopoietic tissue (200–208) ==
- 200 Lymphosarcoma and reticulosarcoma
  - 200.0 Reticulosarcoma
  - 200.1 Lymphosarcoma
  - 200.2 Burkitt's tumor or lymphoma
  - 200.3 Marginal zone lymphoma
  - 200.4 Mantle cell lymphoma
  - 200.5 Primary central nervous system lymphoma
  - 200.6 Anaplastic large cell lymphoma
  - 200.7 Large cell lymphoma
  - 200.8 Other named variants of lymphosarcoma and reticulosarcoma
- 201 Hodgkin's disease
- 202 Other malignant neoplasms of lymphoid and histiocytic tissue
  - 202.0 Nodular lymphoma
  - 202.1 Mycosis fungoides
  - 202.2 Sézary's disease
  - 202.3 Malignant histiocytosis
  - 202.4 Leukemic reticuloendotheliosis (commonly called hairy cell leukemia)
  - 202.5 Letterer-Siwe disease
  - 202.6 Malignant mast cell tumors
  - 202.7 Peripheral T-cell lymphoma
  - 202.8 Other lymphomas
  - 202.9 Other and unspecified malignant neoplasms of lymphoid and histiocytic tissue
- 203 Multiple myeloma and immunoproliferative neoplasms
  - 203.0 Multiple myeloma
- 204 Lymphoid leukemia
  - 204.0 Acute lymphoblastic leukemia
  - 204.1 Chronic lymphocytic leukemia
- 205 Myeloid leukemia
  - 205.0 Acute myelogenous leukemia
  - 205.1 Chronic myelogenous leukemia
- 206 Monocytic leukemia
- 207 Other specified leukemia
  - 207.0 Acute erythremia and erythroleukemia
  - 207.1 Chronic erythremia
  - 207.2 Megakaryocytic leukemia
- 208 Leukemia of unspecified cell type

== Neuroendocrine tumors (209–209) ==
- 209 Neuroendocrine tumors
  - 209.0 Malignant carcinoid tumors of the small intestine
  - 209.1 Malignant carcinoid tumors of the appendix, large intestine, and rectum
  - 209.2 Malignant carcinoid tumors of other and unspecified sites
  - 209.3 Malignant poorly differentiated neuroendocrine carcinoma
  - 209.4 Benign carcinoid tumors of the small intestine
  - 209.5 Benign carcinoid tumors of the appendix, large intestine, and rectum
  - 209.6 Benign carcinoid tumors of other and unspecified sites

== Benign neoplasms (210–229) ==
- 210 Benign neoplasm of lip, oral cavity, and pharynx
- 211 Benign neoplasm of other parts of digestive system
  - 211.3 Colon
    - Familial adenomatous polyposis
- 212 Benign neoplasm of respiratory and intrathoracic organs
  - 212.0 Nasal cavities middle ear and accessory sinuses
  - 212.1 Larynx
  - 212.2 Trachea
  - 212.3 Bronchus and lung
  - 212.4 Pleura
  - 212.5 Mediastinum
  - 212.6 Thymus
  - 212.7 Heart
    - Myxoma
    - Rhabdomyoma
- 213 Benign neoplasm of bone and articular cartilage
  - 213.9 Bone and articular cartilage, site unspecified
    - Chondroma
- 214 Lipoma
- 215 Other benign neoplasm of connective and other soft tissue
- 216 Benign neoplasm of skin
  - Melanocytic nevus
- 217 Benign neoplasm of breast
- 218 Uterine leiomyoma
- 219 Other benign neoplasm of uterus
- 220 Benign neoplasm of ovary
- 221 Benign neoplasm of other female genital organs
- 222 Benign neoplasm of male genital organs
- 223 Benign neoplasm of kidney and other urinary organs
- 224 Benign neoplasm of eye
- 225 Benign neoplasm of brain and other parts of nervous system
- 226 Benign neoplasm of thyroid glands
- 227 Benign neoplasm of other endocrine glands and related structures
- 228 Hemangioma and lymphangioma, any site
  - 228.0 Hemangioma, any site
  - 228.1 Lymphangioma, any site
- 229 Benign neoplasm of other and unspecified sites

== Carcinoma in situ (230–234) ==
- 230 Carcinoma in situ of digestive organs
- 231 Carcinoma in situ of respiratory system
- 232 Carcinoma in situ of skin
- 233 Carcinoma in situ of breast and genitourinary system
- 234 Carcinoma in situ of other and unspecified sites

== Neoplasms of uncertain behavior (235–238) ==
- 235 Neoplasm of uncertain behavior of digestive and respiratory systems
- 236 Neoplasm of uncertain behavior of genitourinary organs
- 237 Neoplasm of uncertain behavior of endocrine glands and nervous system
  - 237.0 Pituitary gland and craniopharyngeal duct
    - Pituitary adenoma
  - 237.7 Neurofibromatosis
- 238 Neoplasm of uncertain behavior of other and unspecified sites and tissues
  - 238.4 Polycythemia vera

== Neoplasms of unspecified nature (239–239) ==
- 239 Neoplasms of unspecified nature
  - 239.2 Skin, soft tissue neoplasm, unspecified
