= List of ICD-9 codes 680–709: diseases of the skin and subcutaneous tissue =

ICD-9 chapters
Chapter	Block	Title
I	001–139	Infectious and Parasitic Diseases
II	140–239	Neoplasms
III	240–279	Endocrine, Nutritional and Metabolic Diseases, and Immunity Disorders
IV	280–289	Diseases of the Blood and Blood-forming Organs
V	290–319	Mental Disorders
VI	320–389	Diseases of the Nervous System and Sense Organs
VII	390–459	Diseases of the Circulatory System
VIII	460–519	Diseases of the Respiratory System
IX	520–579	Diseases of the Digestive System
X	580–629	Diseases of the Genitourinary System
XI	630–679	Complications of Pregnancy, Childbirth, and the Puerperium
XII	680–709	Diseases of the Skin and Subcutaneous Tissue
XIII	710–739	Diseases of the Musculoskeletal System and Connective Tissue
XIV	740–759	Congenital Anomalies
XV	760–779	Certain Conditions originating in the Perinatal Period
XVI	780–799	Symptoms, Signs and Ill-defined Conditions
XVII	800–999	Injury and Poisoning
	E800–E999	Supplementary Classification of External Causes of Injury and Poisoning
	V01–V82	Supplementary Classification of Factors influencing Health Status and Contact with Health Services
	M8000–M9970	Morphology of Neoplasms

This is a shortened version of the twelfth chapter of the ICD-9: Diseases of the Skin and Subcutaneous Tissue. It covers ICD codes 680 to 709. The full chapter can be found on pages 379 to 393 of Volume 1, which contains all (sub)categories of the ICD-9. Volume 2 is an alphabetical index of Volume 1. Both volumes can be downloaded for free from the website of the World Health Organization.

== Infections of skin and subcutaneous tissue (680–686) ==
- 680 Carbuncle and furuncle
  - 680.0 Boil, face
  - 680.1 Boil, neck
  - 680.2 Boil, trunk
  - 680.5 Boil, buttock
- 681 Cellulitis and abscess of finger and toe
  - 681.0 Cellulitis and abscess of finger
    - 681.01 Felon
    - 681.02 Paronychia, finger
  - 681.1 Cellulitis and abscess of toe
    - 681.11 Paronychia, toe
  - 681.9 Cellulitis/abscess, unspec. digit
- 682 Other cellulitis and abscess
  - 682.0 Cellulitis/abscess, face
  - 682.1 Cellulitis/abscess, neck
  - 682.2 Cellulitis/abscess, trunk
  - 682.3 Cellulitis/abscess, upper arm
  - 682.4 Cellulitis/abscess, hand
  - 682.5 Cellulitis/abscess, buttock
  - 682.6 Cellulitis/abscess, leg
  - 682.7 Cellulitis/abscess, foot
  - 682.9 Cellulitis/abscess, unspec.
- 683 Lymphadenitis, acute
- 684 Impetigo
- 685 Pilonidal cyst
  - 685.0 Pilonidal cyst w/ abscess
  - 685.1 Pilonidal cyst, unspec.
- 686 Other local infections of skin and subcutaneous tissue
  - 686.0 Pyoderma
  - 686.1 Pyogenic granuloma of skin and subcutaneous tissue

== Other inflammatory conditions of skin and subcutaneous tissue (690–698) ==
- 690 Erythematosquamous dermatosis
  - 690.1 Seborrheic dermatitis NOS (not otherwise specified)
    - 690.11 Cradle cap
    - 690.18 Dandruff
- 691 Atopic dermatitis and related conditions
  - 691.0 Diaper rash
  - 691.8 Eczema, atopic dermatitis
- 692 Contact dermatitis and other eczema
  - 692.0 Contact dermatitis and other eczema due to detergents
  - 692.1 Contact dermatitis and other eczema due to oils and greases
  - 692.2 Contact dermatitis and other eczema due to solvents
  - 692.3 Contact dermatitis and other eczema due to drugs and medicines in contact with skin
  - 692.4 Contact dermatitis and other eczema due to other chemical products
  - 692.5 Contact dermatitis and other eczema due to food in contact with skin
  - 692.6 Contact dermatitis, due to plants
  - 692.7 Contact dermatitis and other eczema due to solar radiation
    - 692.71 Sunburn
    - 692.72 Solar radiation dermatitis
    - 692.75 Disseminated actinic porokeratosis
  - 692.8 Contact dermatitis and other eczema due to other specified agents
    - 692.81 Dermatitis, due to cosmetics
    - 692.83 Dermatitis, due to metals
  - 692.9 Contact dermatitis NOS
- 693 Dermatitis due to substances taken internally
  - 693.0 Dermatitis due to drugs and medicines taken internally
  - 693.1 Dermatitis due to food taken internally
- 694 Bullous dermatoses
  - 694.0 Dermatitis herpetiformis
  - 694.1 Subcorneal pustular dermatosis
  - 694.2 Juvenile dermatitis herpetiformis
  - 694.3 Impetigo herpetiformis
  - 694.4 Pemphigus
  - 694.5 Pemphigoid
  - 694.6 Benign mucous membrane pemphigoid
  - 694.8 Other specified bullous dermatoses
  - 694.9 Unspecified bullous dermatoses
- 695 Erythematous conditions
  - 695.1 Erythema multiforme
    - 695.10 Erythema multiforme, unspecified
    - 695.11 Erythema multiforme minor
    - 695.12 Erythema multiforme major
    - 695.13 Stevens–Johnson syndrome
    - 695.14 Stevens–Johnson syndrome – toxic epidermal necrolysis overlap syndrome
    - 695.15 Toxic epidermal necrolysis
    - 695.19 Other erythema multiforme
  - 695.2 Erythema nodosum
  - 695.3 Rosacea
  - 695.4 Lupus erythematosus
- 696 Psoriasis and similar disorders
  - 696.0 Psoriatic arthropathy
  - 696.1 Other psoriasis and similar disorders
  - 696.2 Parapsoriasis
  - 696.3 Pityriasis rosea
  - 696.4 Pityriasis rubra pilaris
  - 696.5 Other and unspecified pityriasis
  - 696.8 Other psoriasis and similar disorders
- 697 Lichen
  - 697.0 Lichen planus
  - 697.1 Lichen nitidus
  - 697.8 Other lichen not elsewhere classified
  - 697.9 Lichen unspecified
- 698 Pruritus and related conditions
  - 698.0 Pruritus ani
  - 698.1 Pruritus of genital organs
  - 698.2 Prurigo
  - 698.3 Lichenification and lichen simplex chronicus
  - 698.4 Dermatitis factitia
  - 698.9 Pruritus NOS

== Other diseases of skin and subcutaneous tissue (700–709) ==
- 700 Corns and callosities
- 701 Other hypertrophic and atrophic conditions of skin
  - 701.0 Circumscribed scleroderma
  - 701.1 Keratoderma acquired
  - 701.2 Acquired acanthosis nigricans
  - 701.3 Striae atrophicae
  - 701.4 Keloid scar
  - 701.5 Other abnormal granulation tissue
- 702 Other dermatoses
  - 702.0 Actinic keratosis
  - 702.1 Seborrheic keratosis
- 703 Diseases of nail
  - 703.0 Ingrown nail
- 704 Diseases of hair and hair follicles
  - 704.0 Alopecia, unspec.
  - 704.1 Hirsutism
- 705 Disorders of sweat glands
  - 705.1 Prickly heat, heat rash
    - 705.83 Hidradenitis suppurativa
- 706 Diseases of sebaceous glands
  - 706.0 Acne varioliformis
  - 706.1 Other acne
  - 706.2 Sebaceous cyst
  - 706.3 Seborrhea
  - 706.8 Other specified diseases of sebaceous glands
  - 706.9 Unspecified disease of sebaceous glands
- 707 Chronic ulcer of skin
  - 707.0 Decubitus ulcer
  - 707.1 Ulcer, unspec. of lower limb
  - 707.9 Ulcer, skin, chronic, unspec.
- 708 Urticaria
  - 708.0 Urticaria, allergic
  - 708.1 Urticaria, idiopathic
  - 708.3 Urticaria, dermatographic
  - 708.9 Urticaria, unspec.
- 709 Other disorders of skin and subcutaneous tissue
  - 709.0 Dyschromia
    - 709.01 Vitiligo
  - 709.1 Vascular disorders of skin
  - 709.2 Scar
  - 709.3 Degenerative skin disorders
  - 709.4 Foreign body granuloma of skin and subcutaneous tissue
  - 709.8 Other specified disorders of skin
  - 709.9 Unspecified disorder of skin and subcutaneous tissue
