= List of ICD-9 codes 280–289: diseases of the blood and blood-forming organs =

ICD-9 chapters
Chapter	Block	Title
I	001–139	Infectious and Parasitic Diseases
II	140–239	Neoplasms
III	240–279	Endocrine, Nutritional and Metabolic Diseases, and Immunity Disorders
IV	280–289	Diseases of the Blood and Blood-forming Organs
V	290–319	Mental Disorders
VI	320–389	Diseases of the Nervous System and Sense Organs
VII	390–459	Diseases of the Circulatory System
VIII	460–519	Diseases of the Respiratory System
IX	520–579	Diseases of the Digestive System
X	580–629	Diseases of the Genitourinary System
XI	630–679	Complications of Pregnancy, Childbirth, and the Puerperium
XII	680–709	Diseases of the Skin and Subcutaneous Tissue
XIII	710–739	Diseases of the Musculoskeletal System and Connective Tissue
XIV	740–759	Congenital Anomalies
XV	760–779	Certain Conditions originating in the Perinatal Period
XVI	780–799	Symptoms, Signs and Ill-defined Conditions
XVII	800–999	Injury and Poisoning
	E800–E999	Supplementary Classification of External Causes of Injury and Poisoning
	V01–V82	Supplementary Classification of Factors influencing Health Status and Contact with Health Services
	M8000–M9970	Morphology of Neoplasms

This is a shortened version of the fourth chapter of the ICD-9: Diseases of the Blood and Blood-forming Organs. It covers ICD codes 280 to 289. The full chapter can be found on pages 167 to 175 of Volume 1, which contains all (sub)categories of the ICD-9. Volume 2 is an alphabetical index of Volume 1. Both volumes can be downloaded for free from the website of the World Health Organization.

== Anemia (280–285) ==
- 280 Iron deficiency anemias
  - 280.0 Iron deficiency anemia secondary to blood loss (chronic)
  - 280.1 Iron deficiency anemia secondary to inadequate dietary iron intake
  - 280.8 Other specified iron deficiency anemias
  - 280.9 Iron deficiency anemia, unspecified
- 281 Other deficiency anemias
  - 281.0 pernicious anemia
  - 281.2 Anemia, folate deficiency
  - 281.3 Other specified megaloblastic anemias, not elsewhere classified
- 282 Hereditary hemolytic anemias
  - 282.0 Hereditary spherocytosis
  - 282.2 G6PD
  - 282.5 Sickle-cell trait
  - 282.6 Sickle-cell anemia
- 283 Acquired hemolytic anemias
  - 283.0 Autoimmune hemolytic anemias
    - Warm autoimmune hemolytic anemia
  - 283.1 Non-autoimmune hemolytic anemias
  - 283.2 Hemoglobinuria due to hemolysis from external causes
    - Paroxysmal nocturnal hemoglobinuria
- 284 Aplastic anemia
  - 284.0 Constitutional aplastic anemia
    - 284.01 Constitutional red blood cell aplasia
    - 284.09 Other constitutional aplastic anemia
  - 284.1 Pancytopenia
  - 284.2 Myelophthisis
  - 284.8 Other specified aplastic anemias
    - 284.81 Other specified aplastic anemias
    - 284.89 Red cell aplasia
  - 284.9 Aplastic anemia unspecified
- 285 Other and unspecified anemias
  - 285.0 Sideroblastic anemia
  - 285.1 Acute posthemorrhagic anemia
  - 285.2 Anemia in chronic illness
    - 285.21 Anemia in chronic kidney disease
    - 285.22 Anemia in neoplastic disease
    - 285.29 Anemia of other chronic illness
  - 285.3 Antineoplastic chemotherapy induced anemia
  - 285.8 Other specified anemias
  - 285.9 Anemia unspecified

== Coagulation/hemorrhagic (286–287) ==
- 286 Coagulation defects
  - 286.0 Hemophilia A
  - 286.1 Hemophilia B
  - 286.2 Hemophilia C
  - 286.3 Congenital deficiency of other clotting factors
    - Factor XIII deficiency
  - 286.4 Von Willebrand's disease
  - 286.5 Hemorrhagic disorder due to intrinsic anticoagulants
  - 286.6 Defibrination syndrome
  - 286.7 Acquired coagulation factor deficiency
  - 286.9 Coagulation defects, other
- 287 Purpura and other hemorrhagic conditions
  - 287.0 Allergic purpura
    - Henoch–Schönlein purpura
  - 287.3 Thrombocytopenia, primary
    - 287.31 Immune thrombocytopenic purpura
      - Idiopathic thrombocytopenic purpura
  - 287.4 Thrombocytopenia, secondary
  - 287.9 Hemorrhagic conditions, unspec.

== Other (288–289) ==
- 288 Diseases of white blood cells
  - 288.0 Leukopenia
  - 288.1 Functional disorders of polymorphonuclear neutrophils
  - 288.2 Genetic anomalies of leukocytes
  - 288.3 Eosinophilia
  - 288.4 Hemophagocytic syndromes
  - 288.5 Decreased white blood cell count
    - 288.50 Leukocytopenia, unspecified
    - 288.51 Lymphocytopenia
  - 288.6 Elevated white blood cell count
    - 288.60 Leukocytosis, unspecified
    - 288.61 Lymphocytosis (symptomatic)
    - 288.62 Leukemoid reaction
    - 288.63 Monocytosis (symptomatic)
    - 288.64 Plasmacytosis
    - 288.65 Basophilia
    - 288.66 Bandemia
  - 288.8 Other specified disease of white blood cells
  - 288.9 Abnormal white blood cells, unspec.
- 289 Other diseases of blood and blood-forming organs
  - 289.0 Secondary polycythemia
  - 289.1 Chronic lymphadenitis
  - 289.2 Nonspecific mesenteric lymphadenitis
  - 289.3 Lymphadenitis unspecified except mesenteric
  - 289.4 Hypersplenism
  - 289.5 Other diseases of spleen
    - 289.50 Disease of spleen unspecified
    - 289.51 Chronic congestive splenomegaly
    - 289.52 Splenic sequestration
    - 289.53 Neutropenic splenomegaly
    - 289.59 Other diseases of spleen
  - 289.6 Familial polycythemia
  - 289.7 Methemoglobinemia
  - 289.8 Other specified diseases of blood and blood-forming organs
    - 289.81 Primary hypercoagulable state
    - 289.82 Secondary hypercoagulable state
    - 289.83 Myelofibrosis
    - 289.84 Heparin-induced thrombocytopenia
    - 289.89 Other specified diseases of blood and blood-forming organs
  - 289.9 Unspecified diseases of blood and blood-forming organs
