= Urethral syndrome =

- Specialty: Urology

Urethral syndrome is defined as symptoms suggestive of a lower urinary tract infection but in the absence of significant bacteriuria with a conventional pathogen. It is a diagnosis of exclusion in patients with dysuria and frequency without demonstrable infection. In women, vaginitis should also be ruled out.

== Causes ==
Signs indicative of urethral syndrome include a history of chronic recurrent urinary tract infections (UTI) in the absence of both conventional bacterial growth and pyuria (more than 5 white blood cells per high power field). Episodes are often related to sexual intercourse.

Some physicians believe that urethral syndrome may be due to a low grade infection of the Skene's glands on the sides and bottom of the urethra. The Skene's glands are embryologically related to the prostate gland in the male, thus urethral syndrome may share a comparable cause with chronic prostatitis.

Possible non-infective causes include hormonal imbalance, trauma, allergies, anatomical features such as diverticula, and post-surgical scarring and adhesions.

== Treatment ==
In a small minority of cases of the urethral syndrome, treatment with antibiotics is effective, which indicates that in some cases it may be caused by a bacterial infection which does not show up in either urinalysis or urine culture. For chronic urethral syndrome, a long term, low-dose antibiotic treatment is given on a continuous basis or after intercourse each time if intercourse appears to trigger symptoms.

As low oestrogen may also be considered a source for urethral syndrome, hormone replacement therapy and oral contraceptive pill (birth-control pills) containing oestrogen are also used to treat the symptoms of this condition in women.

== See also ==
- Interstitial cystitis
- Prostatitis
- Chronic prostatitis/chronic pelvic pain syndrome
- Neurogenic bladder dysfunction
