= Gnathitis =

- Specialty: ENT surgery

Gnathitis is jaw inflammation.
