= Accessory visual structures =

External parts of the eye

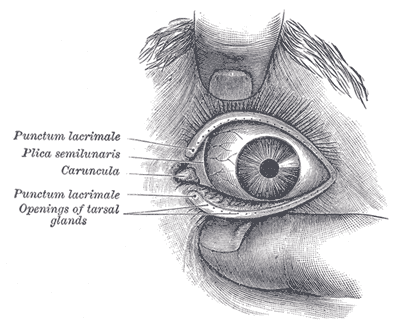
- Front of left eye with eyelids separated.

Details

Identifiers
- Latin: structurae oculi accessoriae or adnexa oculi
- TA98: A15.2.07.001
- TA2: 6815
- FMA: 76554

The accessory visual structures (or adnexa of eye, ocular adnexa, etc.) are the protecting and supporting structures (adnexa) of the eye, including the eyebrow, eyelids, and lacrimal apparatus. The eyebrows, eyelids, eyelashes, lacrimal gland and drainage apparatus all play a crucial role with regard to globe protection, lubrication, and minimizing the risk of ocular infection. The adnexal structures also help to keep the cornea moist and clean.

One source defines "ocular adnexa" as the orbit, conjunctiva, and eyelids. The orbit and extraocular muscles allow for the smooth movement of the eyeball.

== Eyebrow ==
The eyebrow is an area of thick, short hairs above the eye. The main function is to prevent sweat, water, and other debris falling into the eye, but they are also important to human communication and facial expressions.

== Eyelid ==
An eyelid is a thin fold of skin that covers and protects the eye. The levator palpebrae superioris muscle helps in the movement of eyelid. The human eyelid features a row of eyelashes along the eyelid margin, which helps in protection of the eye from dust and foreign debris. The main function of the eyelid is to keep the cornea moist and clean.

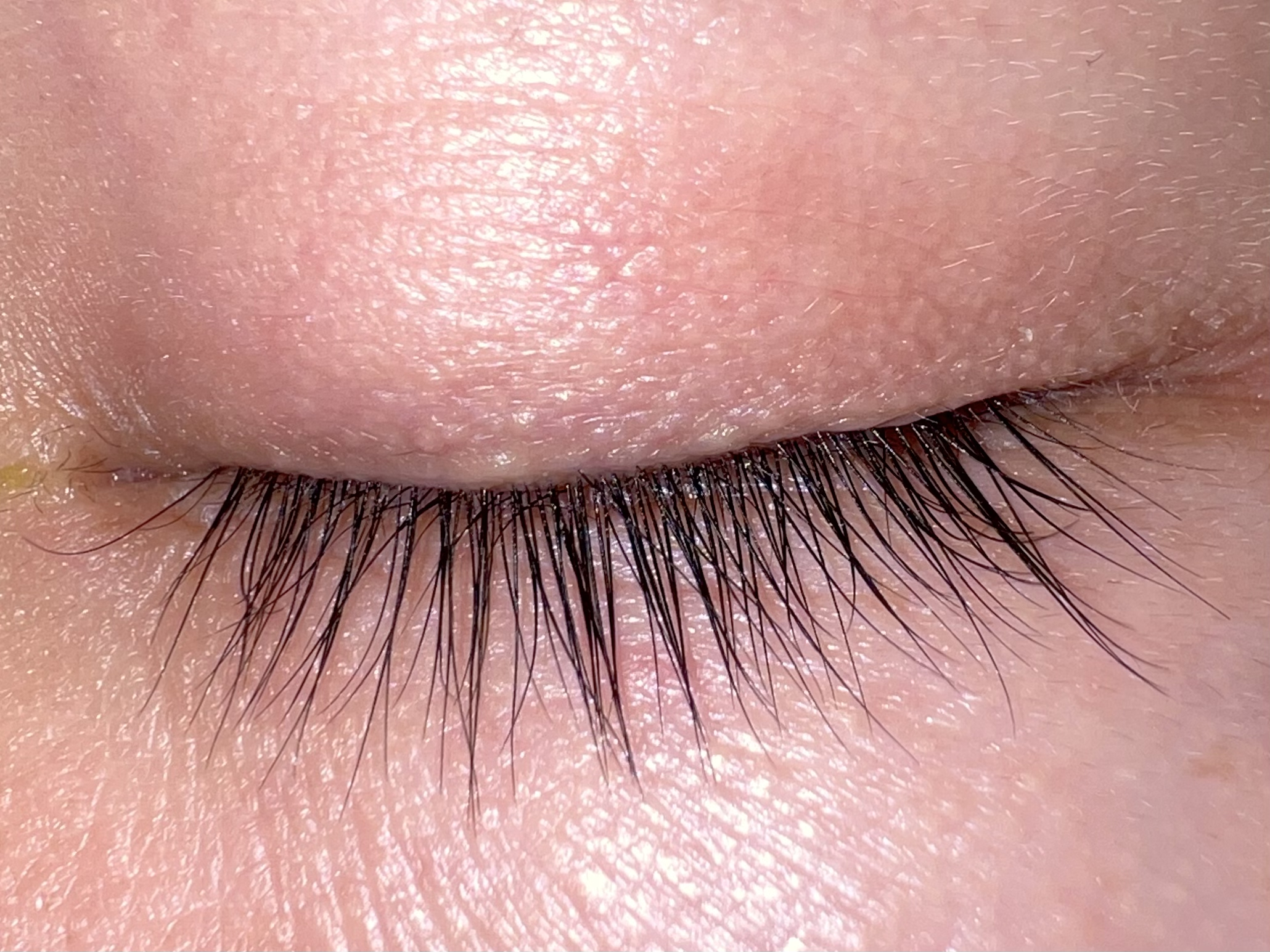
Eyelid and prominent eyelashes of a human adult

== Eyelash ==
The eyelashes are the numerous hairs that grow along the eyelid margin and are highly sensitive to touch. They function to heighten protection of the eye by catching dust and debris via blinking, and to regulate evaporation of the tear film of the cornea. Eyelashes are also important in human society and beauty standards, as prominent lashes draw attention to the eyes and thus are a universally desirable facial feature.

== Conjunctiva ==
The conjunctiva is a tissue that lines the inside of the eyelids and covers the sclera. It is composed of unkeratinized, stratified squamous epithelium with goblet cells, and stratified columnar epithelium. The conjunctiva is basically transparent, and the white colour we see is actually sclera.

== Lacrimal apparatus ==
The lacrimal apparatus is the physiological system containing the orbital structures for tear production and drainage.
It consists of:

- The lacrimal gland, which secretes the tears, and its excretory ducts, which convey the fluid to the surface of the human eye; it is a serous gland located in lacrimal fossa. It is a j-shaped gland;
- The lacrimal canaliculi, the lacrimal sac, and the nasolacrimal duct, by which the fluid is conveyed into the cavity of the nose, emptying anterioinferiorly to the inferior nasal conchae from the nasolacrimal duct;
- The innervation of the lacrimal apparatus involves both the a sympathetic supply through the carotid plexus of nerves around the internal carotid artery, and parasympathetically from the lacrimal nucleus of the facial nerve.

== The orbit ==
The orbit is the cavity or socket of the skull in which the eye and its appendages are situated. In the adult human, the volume of the orbit is 30 millilitres (1.06 imp fl oz; 1.01 US fl oz), of which the eye occupies 6.5 ml (0.23 imp fl oz; 0.22 US fl oz). The orbit helps in smooth rotation of the eyeball.
