= Locked twins =

- Specialty: Obstetrics

Locked twins is a rare complication of multiple pregnancy where two fetuses become interlocked during presentation before birth. It occurs in roughly 1 in 1,000 twin deliveries and 1 in 90,000 deliveries overall. Most often, locked twins are delivered via Caesarean section, given that the condition has been diagnosed early enough. The fetal mortality rate is high for the twin that presents first, with over 50% being stillborn.

== Description ==
There are two types of locked twins: breech/vertex and vertex/vertex. In breech/vertex presentations, which are much more common, the first twin is in the breech position, presenting feet-first, and the second is in the cephalic (vertex) position, presenting in the normal head-first manner. In these cases, the chin of the first twin locks behind the chin of the second twin while in the uterus or birth canal, preventing vaginal delivery. In vertex/vertex presentations, where both twins are positioned for head-first delivery, the two heads become locked at the pelvic brim, preventing either fetus from passing through the pelvic inlet in a vaginal delivery.

Contributing factors to the interlocking of twins include uterine hypertonicity, small fetal size, and reduced levels of amniotic fluid following rupture of the membranes. It is more likely to occur in women with large pelvises, young primigravidae (young women in their first pregnancy), and pregnancies with monoamniotic twins.

== Management ==
If locked twins are diagnosed in early delivery, before either twin is born, both fetuses can be delivered by Caesarean section. If one fetus has been partially born, attempts can be made to disimpact the twins manually, such as by the Zavanelli maneuver, with a view to performing an assisted delivery with ventouse or forceps. If the diagnosis is made only after the first locked twin has died in the birth canal, or if it is not expected to survive, the first twin may be decapitated and its head pushed up to allow safe delivery of the second twin.

At least one case has been reported where hexoprenaline was used to relax the uterine smooth muscle to thereby temporarily inhibit labour and disimpact the fetal heads.

== Outcomes ==
Since locked twins are often diagnosed in the late stages of delivery, it is often too late to intervene to save the life of the first twin and thus there is a high rate of stillbirth, estimated to be over 50%.
