= Adverse food reaction =

Adverse response by the body to food

An adverse food reaction is an adverse response by the body to food or a specific type of food.

The most common adverse reaction is a food allergy, which is an adverse immune response to either a specific type or a range of food proteins.

However, other adverse responses to food are not allergies. These reactions include responses to food such as food intolerance, pharmacological reactions, and toxin-mediated reactions, as well as physical responses, such as choking.
