= List of ICD-9 codes =

The following is a list of codes for International Statistical Classification of Diseases and Related Health Problems.

- List of ICD-9 codes 001–139: infectious and parasitic diseases
- List of ICD-9 codes 140–239: neoplasms
- List of ICD-9 codes 240–279: endocrine, nutritional and metabolic diseases, and immunity disorders
- List of ICD-9 codes 280–289: diseases of the blood and blood-forming organs
- List of ICD-9 codes 290–319: mental disorders
- List of ICD-9 codes 320–389: diseases of the nervous system and sense organs
- List of ICD-9 codes 390–459: diseases of the circulatory system
- List of ICD-9 codes 460–519: diseases of the respiratory system
- List of ICD-9 codes 520–579: diseases of the digestive system
- List of ICD-9 codes 580–629: diseases of the genitourinary system
- List of ICD-9 codes 630–679: complications of pregnancy, childbirth, and the puerperium
- List of ICD-9 codes 680–709: diseases of the skin and subcutaneous tissue
- List of ICD-9 codes 710–739: diseases of the musculoskeletal system and connective tissue
- List of ICD-9 codes 740–759: congenital anomalies
- List of ICD-9 codes 760–779: certain conditions originating in the perinatal period
- List of ICD-9 codes 780–799: symptoms, signs, and ill-defined conditions
- List of ICD-9 codes 800–999: injury and poisoning
- List of ICD-9 codes E and V codes: external causes of injury and supplemental classification

== See also ==
- International Statistical Classification of Diseases and Related Health Problems: ICD-9 – provides multiple external links for looking up ICD codes
