= Gene therapy for osteoarthritis =

Gene therapy for osteoarthritis is the application of gene therapy to treat osteoarthritis (OA). Unlike pharmacological treatments which are administered locally or systemically as a series of interventions, gene therapy aims to establish sustained therapeutic effect after a single, local injection.

The main risk factors for osteoarthritis are age and body mass index, as such, OA is predominantly considered a disease of aging. As the body ages, catabolic factors begin to predominate over anabolic factors resulting in a reduction of extracellular matrix gene expression and reduced cellularity in articular cartilage. Catabolism eventually predominates over anabolism to such an extent that severe cartilage erosions and bone marrow lesions / remodeling manifest in clinical osteoarthritis. Joint inflammation is also a key mechanism in OA, and a number of pro-inflammatory cytokines, particularly IL-1, have been implicated in pathophysiology, human genetics, and animal models of disease. In addition, osteoarthritis has a number of heritable factors, and there may be additional genetic risk factors for the disease.

Gene augmentation, gene replacement, and novel transgene gene therapy strategies for the potential medical management of osteoarthritis are under preliminary research to define pathological mechanisms and possible treatments for this chronic disease. While viral vector gene therapies predominate, both viral and non-viral vectors have been developed as a means to deliver therapeutic genes.

== Other gene augmentation approaches ==
Other approaches have involved other anabolic and anti-catabolic factors. As the body ages, catabolic factors begin to predominate over anabolic factors. In osteoarthritis, catabolic factors promote the degradation of articular cartilage and decrease the total cell content of cartilage. While the body is young, anabolic factors are able to replace the lost cartilage and cartilage producing cells, however, this ability appears to decrease with age. Gene Augmentation approaches, such as the delivery of FGF18 and PRG4 aim to augment the natural anabolic processes within the joint, to delay the progression of cartilage degeneration. Anabolic factors appear to be successful in clinical studies when delivered in the form of repeat protein injections, however, due to the pharmacokinetics of articular joints, these approaches require up to 12 injections per year in bilateral osteoarthritis, and may need to be sustained indefinitely to prevent reversal of cartilage gains. Gene Augmentation approaches aim to replicate the success of anabolic protein therapies by delivering the genetic instructions for these factors in the form of single injection treatments.

== Gene replacement approaches ==
Passing from parents to children, genes are the building blocks of inheritance. They contain instructions for making proteins. If genes do not produce the right proteins in a correct way, a child can develop a genetic disorder. Gene therapy is a molecular method aiming to replace defective or absent genes, or to counteract the ones undergoing overexpression. For this purpose, genes may be inserted into delivery vectors and administered to target cells to augment or replace defective genetic material. The most common form of gene therapy involves inserting a normal gene to replace an abnormal gene. Other approaches include repairing an abnormal gene and altering the degree to which a gene is turned on or off. Two basic methodologies are utilized to transfer vectors into target tissues; Ex vivo gene transfer and In vivo gene transfer. One type of gene therapy, also often referred to as Cell Therapy (or genetically modified Cell Therapy) in which the gene transfer takes place outside the patient's body is called ex vivo gene therapy. This method of gene therapy is more complicated since the cells first have to be harvested from the patient in an invasive procedure. The harvested cells also need to be manipulated in a sterile manner and care must be taken to not damage the cells or their genetic material. Alternative approaches allow for the use of autologous stem cells, which have not been originally harvested from the patient undergoing treatment. Such approaches need to rely on "cloaking" technology to ensure that the cells are not eliminated from the body once detected as foreign. This "cloaking" often requires the use of additional genetic manipulation, such as the insertion of a CD47 gene to express a "don't eat me" signal on the surface of the cells to make them hypoimmune. A major challenge with the use of cell therapy for Osteoarthritis is the nature of the articular joints, which experience significant shear leading to rapid loss of transplanted cells. Genetically modified cell therapies for the treatment of osteoarthritis are currently strictly investigated and their safety and effectiveness claims have not been reviewed by the FDA.

== Significance and causes of osteoarthritis ==
Primary osteoarthritis (OA) is a degenerative joint disease which is the western world's leading cause of pain and disability. It is characterized by the progressive loss of normal structure and function of articular cartilage, the smooth tissue covering the end of the moving bones. This chronic disease not only affects the articular cartilage but also the subchondral bone, the synovium, and periarticular tissues. Individuals with OA can experience severe pain and limited motion, and the disease often tends to progress as the body ages. OA is mostly the result of natural aging of the joint due to biochemical changes in the cartilage extracellular matrix.

While age and BMI are the main risk factors for osteoarthritis, contributors such as joint trauma and mechanical overloading of joints or joint-instability can accelerate or exacerbate the condition. OA caused by secondary factors such as joint injury or damage to the subchondral bone is referred to as secondary osteoarthritis. Since the degeneration of cartilage is not naturally reversible, it will continue to progress, eventually resulting in the need for joint replacement as a potential terminal intervention. Due to the prevalence of OA, the repair and regeneration of articular cartilage has become a dominant area of research. The growing number of people suffering from osteoarthritis and the potential of some gene therapy approaches, attracts a great deal of attention to the development of genetic medicines for the treatment of this chronic disease.

== Vectors for osteoarthritis gene delivery ==
Various vectors have been developed to carry therapeutic genes to cells. There are two broad categories of gene delivery vectors: Viral vectors, involving viruses as the genetic carriers and non-viral agents, such as polymers, lipid nanoparticles, and liposomes.

=== Viral vectors ===
Viral vectors are the most widely used gene delivery method as they have evolved to do this job with a high degree of efficiency and specificity. When using viral vectors for gene delivery, researchers aim to remove all of the viruses undesired genes and replace them with at least one therapeutic gene. The combination of their evolutionary origin and broad use, makes viral vectors highly effective at delivering genetic cargo to cells, and significantly reduces the risks associated with using this delivery method.

When administered systemically, or in high doses, viral vectors may induce an inflammatory response, which can cause minor side effects such as edema or serious ones like multisystem organ failure. It may also be difficult to administer gene therapy repeatedly due to the immune system's enhanced response to viruses. However, viral vectors delivered locally to the joint, appear to be well contained within the joint area and are very well tolerated based on preclinical and early clinical studies. Furthermore, the durability of therapeutic transgene expression appears to be such, that a single injection therapy may be sufficient to reverse progression of a disease. The most commonly used viral vectors today are Adeno-Associated Viruses (AAVs), since AAVs do not appear to cause any disease in humans, have low immunogenicity, and are non-replicating, they have proven to be safe and effective in a number of indications. Adenoviruses have also been investigated in the clinic for the treatment of Osteoarthritis, however, since adenoviruses are highly immunogenic, their most successful application has been in the delivery of adenoviral vector vaccines.

=== Non-viral vectors ===
Non-viral methods involve complexing therapeutic DNA to various macromolecules including cationic lipids and liposomes, polymers, polyamines and polyethylenimine, and nanoparticles. FuGene 6 and modified cationic liposomes are two non-viral gene delivery methods that have so far been utilized for gene delivery to cartilage. FuGene 6 is a non-liposomal lipid formulation, which has proved to be successful in transfecting a variety of cell lines (cancerous cells used for in vitro research). Liposomes have shown to be a potential candidate for gene delivery, in this approach cationic liposomes are made to facilitate the interaction with the cell membranes to deliver nucleic acids. Non-viral vectors may have the capacity to deliver a large amount of therapeutic genes repeatedly and may be lower cost to produce at large scale. Another advantage of non-viral delivery methods is that they do not elicit a memory immune response and may be administered several times. In spite of having advantages, non-viral vectors have not yet replaced viral vectors due to relatively low efficiency, toxicity of the individual formulation components, and short-term transgene expression. As a result, while a number of viral vectors have successfully been used in several clinical studies, non-viral vectors for intra-articular delivery have thus far only been investigated preclinically.

== Target cells ==
The cells targeted for the treatment of osteoarthritis are chondrocytes, synoviocytes, and their progenitors. Since the joint capsule is relatively well contained, intra-articular injections are highly successful at delivering the therapeutic gene therapy locally to the target cell types.

Treatment of osteoarthritis may be successful via:

- Stimulation of anabolic pathways to rebuild the matrix or chondrocyte content of cartilage. This approach may result in reversal of the disease (Examples include: FGF18).
- Inhibition of catabolic pathways to prevent further degeneration of cartilage. This approach may result in slowing of the disease progression, but not reversal (Examples include: IL-1Ra).
- Replacing of the damaged cells or tissues with cells with or without a matrix. This approach may result in reversal of the disease pathology, but has thus far only been successful for the treatment of focal cartilage lesions (Examples include: MACI and Hyalofast).
- Avoiding the pathological or symptomatic complications such as the reduction of pain or formation of osteophytes (Examples include, steroids and viscosupplements).

Thus far, the most promising therapies appear to be those focused on promoting cartilage anabolism. Specifically, only the chondro-anabolic FGF18 therapy which uses the recombinant protein analog of FGF18, sprifermin, has been able to demonstrate an ability to increase cartilage thickness in a dose-dependent manner, arrest progression to joint replacement, and reduce pain and clinically meaningful symptom progression. Based on this success, FGF18 is also being investigated as a gene therapy for the treatment of OA.

While several anti-inflammatory or anti-catabolic approaches have been reported in preclinical studies, none of the clinical studies to date have produced any evidence of efficacy in modifying disease progression (e.g. IGF-I/IL-1RA, steroids). Some anti-inflammatory treatments, have actually been demonstrated to promote cartilage degeneration with long-term use.

== Gene defects leading to osteoarthritis ==
While Osteoarthritis is mainly a disease of aging, it has some degree of heritability. Epidemiological studies have shown that a genetic component may be an important risk factor in OA. Insulin-like growth factor I genes (IGF-1), Transforming growth factorβ, cartilage oligomeric matrix protein, bone morphogenetic protein, and other anabolic gene candidates are among the candidate genes for OA. Genetic changes in OA can lead to defects of a structural protein such as collagen, or changes in the metabolism of bone and cartilage. OA is rarely considered as a simple disorder following Mendelian inheritance being predominantly a multifactorial disease.

However, in the field of OA gene therapy, researches has focused on gene transfer as a delivery system for therapeutic gene products, rather counteracting genetic abnormalities or polymorphisms. Genes, which contribute to protect and restore the matrix of articular cartilage, are attracting the most attention. These Genes are listed in Table 1. Among all candidates listed below, only FGF18 has been successful at a protein level in initial clinical studies. Other candidates, such as proteins that block the actions of interleukin-1 (IL-1) (interleukin-1 receptor antagonists / IL-1Ra) have been evaluated as both protein or gene therapy injections and were either abandoned (as in the case of the protein) or did not report any efficacy in disease modification (as in the case of gene therapies).

Table 1- Candidates for OA gene therapy
Category	Gene Candidate
Promotes cartilage formation	FGF18
Cytokine/cytokine antagonist	IL-1Ra, sIL-1R, sTNFR, IL-4
Cartilage growth factor	IGF-1, FGF, BMPs, TGF, CGDF
Matrix breakdown inhibitor	TIMPs, PAIs, serpins
Signaling molecule/transcription factor	Smad, Sox-9, IkB
Apoptosis Inhibitor	Bcl-2
Extra cellular matrix molecule	Type II collagen, COMP
Free radical antagonist	Super Oxide Dismutase

== Osteoarthritis targets ==
=== Interleukin-1 ===
Preclinical studies suggest that a pro-inflammatory Interleukin-1 (IL1) is a contributor to joint pain, cartilage loss, and inflammation. Although prior approaches with recombinant proteins have shown mixed results, gene therapy remains a promising avenue for IL-1 inhibition. A therapeutic gene with potential to counteract the effect of Interleukin-1, the Interleukin 1 receptor antagonist (IL-1Ra), is currently being evaluated in early clinical trials with several delivery vectors including AAV and Adenovirus. The natural agonist of IL-1, is a protein that binds non-productively to the cell surface of interleukin-1 receptor, blocking the activity of IL-1 via the IL-1 receptor. A number of studies in dogs, rabbits, and horses suggested that local IL-1Ra gene therapy is safe and effective in animal models of OA, however, none of these findings have translated to clinical efficacy despite both the protein and gene therapy being evaluated in multiple clinical trials.

=== FGF18 ===
Another gene therapy approach uses FGF-18 as a potential anabolic agent. A prior clinical trial using sprifermin (FGF-18 protein, rather than gene therapy) showed that spirefermin was able to increase cartilage thickness in a dose dependent manner in placebo controlled, randomized clinical studies. The trial also demonstrated the potential of FGF18 to arrest progression to joint replacement over the study period. Finally, FGF18 was able to reduce pain (WOMAC) and clinically meaningful symptom progression, in both the full trial population and the high-risk subgroup. Based on these highly promising clinical results, FGF18 is being investigated as a gene therapy for the treatment of osteoarthritis.

== Strategies ==
In the context of OA, the most attractive intra-articular sites for gene transfer are the synovium and the articular cartilage. Most experimental progress has been made with gene transfer to a convenient intra-articular tissue, such as the hyaline cartilage or the synovium, tissues amenable to genetic modification by a variety of vectors, using both in vivo and ex vivo protocols.

=== Gene transfer to cartilage ===
Chondrocytes are non-dividing cells (with the exception of chondrocyte progenitors), embedded in a network of collagens and proteoglycans; however researches suggest that genes can be transferred to chondrocytes within normal or arthritic cartilage by intraarticular injection of AAVs or liposomes containing sendai virus (HVJ- liposomes). Since chondrocytes are considered resident cells of the joint, with lower turnover rates than synoviocytes, gene delivery strategies to chondrocytes may provide a higher degree of durability.

Most efficient methods of gene transfer to cartilage have involved in vivo strategies delivering AAVs directly to joints via intra-articular injection. Of the AAV serotypes studied, AAV2 appears to be particularly effective at transducing Chondrocytes and Synoviocytes, whereas AAV serotype 2.5 has shown efficient delivery to human cartilage explants and to horse joints in vivo.

Some currently evaluated strategies for gene delivery to chondrocytes include FGF18, PRG4, and IL-1Ra.

=== Gene transfer to synovium ===
The major purpose of gene delivery is to alter the lining of the joint in a way that enables them to serve as an endogenous source of therapeutic molecules that can diffuse and influence the metabolism of adjacent tissues such as cartilage. Genes may be delivered to synovium in animal models of RA and OA by direct, in vivo injection of vector or by indirect, ex vivo methods involving autologous synovial cells, skin fibroblasts, or other cell types such as mesenchymal stem cells. Synoviocytes, which are the predominant cell type in the synovium are closely related to fibroblasts, and have relatively high turnover rates (when compared to for example chondrocyte cells). As such, gene therapy treatment of the synovium is likely to be challenged by low durability. Also, since osteoarthritis is the disease of cartilage tissues, treating the synovium is an indirect approach and may be complicated by lack of therapeutic activity.

However, gene therapy administered into the intra-articular space is likely to deliver the therapeutic gene to both cartilage and synovial tissues, the preference for the tissue type may be further modified by selecting a specific delivery vector. Some delivery vectors and their advantages and limitations are listed in Table 2:

Table 2- Performance of different vectors for intra-articular in vivo gene delivery
Vector	Comment
Adeno-associated virus	Excellent transduction efficiency and biocompatibility in joints
Adenovirus	Highly inflammatory with dose-dependent side-effects in joints
Retrovirus	No transduction of normal synovium; modest transduction of inflamed synovium
Lentivirus	High transduction of joint cells, but may cause oncogenic integrations
Herpes simplex virus	Highly efficient transduction; cytotoxic
Non-viral Vectors	Short-term and less efficient transfection; may promote inflammation

The indirect ex vivo approach involves harvest of synovium, cartilage, or bone marrow cells, isolation and culture of the harvested cells, in vitro transduction with the therapeutic gene of interest, and injection of engineered cells into the joint.

== Safety ==
One important issue related to human gene therapy is safety, particularly for the gene therapy of a debilitating, but non-fatal disease such as OA. The main concern is the high immunogenicity of certain viral vectors such as Adenoviruses, which may further exacerbate the pathology. Retroviral vectors permanently integrate into the chromosomes of the cells they infect, there will be always a chance of integrating into a tumor suppressor gene or an oncogene, leading to oncogenic transformation of the cell. As a result, the most advanced therapies focus on the use of non-integrating vectors, low doses, and intra-articular (rather than systemic) delivery. All approaches involving genetic modification are currently only investigational, not approved by the FDA, EMA, or any other regulator; as such, their safety and efficacy statements have not been reviewed or approved by regulatory agencies and the treatments are not approved for commercial use.

== See also ==
- Disease Modifying Osteoarthritis Drug
- Vectors in gene therapy
- Protein therapy
- Adeno-associated virus
- Gene therapy for epilepsy
- Management of Parkinson's disease
