= Sprifermin =

Human recombinant FGF18

Clinical data
- Other names: AS-902330; rhFGF18; L-Methionyl(human fibroblast growth factor 18 (FGF-18, zFGF5)-(1-169)-peptide)

Identifiers
- CAS Number: 890058-52-3
- UNII: UEJ4E476ZP

Chemical and physical data
- Formula: C_{876}H_{1396}N_{258}O_{256}S_{6}
- Molar mass: 19830.71 g·mol^{−1}
- 3D model (JSmol): Interactive image
- SMILES: CC[C@H](C)[C@H](NC(=O)[C@H](CCCNC(=N)N)NC(=O)[C@H](CCCNC(=N)N)NC(=O)CNC(=O)[C@H](CC(C)C)NC(=O)[C@@H](NC(=O)[C@H](CCC(=O)N)NC(=O)[C@@H](NC(=O)[C@H](Cc1cnc[nH]1)NC(=O)[C@H](CCCCN)NC(=O)CNC(=O)[C@H](CO)NC(=O)[C@@H](NC(=O)[C@H](CCCNC(=N)N)NC(=O)[C@H](CO)NC(=O)[C@H](Cc2ccc(O)cc2)NC(=O)[C@H](CC(C)C)NC(=O)[C@H](CCC(=O)N)NC(=O)[C@H](Cc3ccc(O)cc3)NC(=O)[C@H](CC(C)C)NC(=O)[C@H](CCCNC(=N)N)NC(=O)[C@H](CC(C)C)NC(=O)[C@H](CCC(=O)N)NC(=O)[C@H](CCCCN)NC(=O)[C@H](CCCNC(=N)N)NC(=O)[C@H](CO)NC(=O)[C@@H](NC(=O)[C@H](CC(=O)O)NC(=O)[C@H](CC(=O)O)NC(=O)[C@H](CCCNC(=N)N)NC(=O)[C@H](C)NC(=O)[C@H](CCCNC(=N)N)NC(=O)[C@@H](NC(=O)[C@H](CCC(=O)N)NC(=O)[C@H](CC(=O)N)NC(=O)[C@H](CCC(=O)O)NC(=O)[C@@H](NC(=O)[C@H](Cc4cnc[nH]4)NC(=O)[C@@H](NC(=O)[C@H](CCCNC(=N)N)NC(=O)[C@H](Cc5ccccc5)NC(=O)[C@H](CC(=O)O)NC(=O)[C@@H](NC(=O)[C@H](CC(=O)N)NC(=O)[C@H](CCC(=O)O)NC(=O)[C@H](CCC(=O)O)NC(=O)[C@@H](N)CCSC)C(C)C)[C@@H](C)CC)C(C)C)[C@@H](C)O)C(C)C)[C@@H](C)O)[C@@H](C)CC)C(C)C)C(=O)N[C@@H](CO)C(=O)N[C@@H](C)C(=O)N[C@@H](CCCNC(=N)N)C(=O)NCC(=O)N[C@@H](CCC(=O)O)C(=O)N[C@@H](CC(=O)O)C(=O)NCC(=O)N[C@@H](CC(=O)O)C(=O)N[C@@H](CCCCN)C(=O)N[C@@H](Cc6ccc(O)cc6)C(=O)N[C@@H](C)C(=O)N[C@@H](CCC(=O)N)C(=O)N[C@@H](CC(C)C)C(=O)N[C@@H](CC(C)C)C(=O)N[C@@H](C(C)C)C(=O)N[C@@H](CCC(=O)O)C(=O)N[C@@H]([C@@H](C)O)C(=O)N[C@@H](CC(=O)O)C(=O)N[C@@H]([C@@H](C)O)C(=O)N[C@@H](Cc7ccccc7)C(=O)NCC(=O)N[C@@H](CO)C(=O)N[C@@H](CCC(=O)N)C(=O)N[C@@H](C(C)C)C(=O)N[C@@H](CCCNC(=N)N)C(=O)N[C@@H]([C@@H](C)CC)C(=O)N[C@@H](CCCCN)C(=O)NCC(=O)N[C@@H](CCCCN)C(=O)N[C@@H](CCC(=O)O)C(=O)N[C@@H]([C@@H](C)O)C(=O)N[C@@H](CCC(=O)O)C(=O)N[C@@H](Cc8ccccc8)C(=O)N[C@@H](Cc9ccc(O)cc9)C(=O)N[C@@H](CC(C)C)C(=O)N[C@H]%10CSSC[C@H](NC(=O)[C@H](CCC(=O)O)NC(=O)[C@H](CCCCN)NC(=O)[C@H](CO)NC(=O)[C@@H](NC(=O)CNC(=O)[C@H](CC(=O)O)NC(=O)[C@@H]%11CCCN%11C(=O)[C@H](CCCCN)NC(=O)CNC(=O)[C@@H](NC(=O)[C@H](CC(C)C)NC(=O)[C@H](CCCCN)NC(=O)CNC(=O)[C@H](CCCCN)NC(=O)[C@H](CCCNC(=N)N)NC(=O)[C@H](CC(=O)N)NC(=O)[C@H](CCSC)NC%10=O)C(C)C)[C@@H](C)O)C(=O)N[C@@H](C(C)C)C(=O)N[C@@H](Cc%12ccccc%12)C(=O)N[C@@H]([C@@H](C)CC)C(=O)N[C@@H](CCC(=O)O)C(=O)N[C@@H](CCCCN)C(=O)N[C@@H](C(C)C)C(=O)N[C@@H](CC(C)C)C(=O)N[C@@H](CCC(=O)O)C(=O)N[C@@H](CC(=O)N)C(=O)N[C@@H](CC(=O)N)C(=O)N[C@@H](Cc%13ccc(O)cc%13)C(=O)N[C@@H]([C@@H](C)O)C(=O)N[C@@H](C)C(=O)N[C@@H](CC(C)C)C(=O)N[C@@H](CCSC)C(=O)N[C@@H](CO)C(=O)N[C@@H](C)C(=O)N[C@@H](CCCCN)C(=O)N[C@@H](Cc%14ccc(O)cc%14)C(=O)N[C@@H](CO)C(=O)NCC(=O)N[C@@H](Cc%15c[nH]c%16ccccc%15%16)C(=O)N[C@@H](Cc%17ccc(O)cc%17)C(=O)N[C@@H](C(C)C)C(=O)NCC(=O)N[C@@H](Cc%18ccccc%18)C(=O)N[C@@H]([C@@H](C)O)C(=O)N[C@@H](CCCCN)C(=O)N[C@@H](CCCCN)C(=O)NCC(=O)N[C@@H](CCCNC(=N)N)C(=O)N%19CCC[C@H]%19C(=O)N[C@@H](CCCNC(=N)N)C(=O)N[C@@H](CCCCN)C(=O)NCC(=O)N%20CCC[C@H]%20C(=O)N[C@@H](CCCCN)C(=O)N[C@@H]([C@@H](C)O)C(=O)N[C@@H](CCCNC(=N)N)C(=O)N[C@@H](CCC(=O)O)C(=O)N[C@@H](CC(=O)N)C(=O)N[C@@H](CCC(=O)N)C(=O)N[C@@H](CCC(=O)N)C(=O)N[C@@H](CC(=O)O)C(=O)N[C@@H](C(C)C)C(=O)N[C@@H](Cc%21cnc[nH]%21)C(=O)N[C@@H](Cc%22ccccc%22)C(=O)N[C@@H](CCSC)C(=O)N[C@@H](CCCCN)C(=O)N[C@@H](CCCNC(=N)N)C(=O)N[C@@H](Cc%23ccc(O)cc%23)C(=O)N%24CCC[C@H]%24C(=O)N[C@@H](CCCCN)C(=O)NCC(=O)N[C@@H](CCC(=O)N)C(=O)N%25CCC[C@H]%25C(=O)N[C@@H](CCC(=O)O)C(=O)N[C@@H](CC(C)C)C(=O)N[C@@H](CCC(=O)N)C(=O)N[C@@H](CCCCN)C(=O)N%26CCC[C@H]%26C(=O)N[C@@H](Cc%27ccccc%27)C(=O)N[C@@H](CCCCN)C(=O)N[C@@H](Cc%28ccc(O)cc%28)C(=O)N[C@@H]([C@@H](C)O)C(=O)N[C@@H]([C@@H](C)O)C(=O)N[C@@H](C(C)C)C(=O)N[C@@H]([C@@H](C)O)C(=O)N[C@@H](CCCCN)C(=O)O

Sprifermin (INN; development code AS-902330) is a recombinant human fibroblast growth factor 18 (rhFGF18) analog, originally developed by Merck, and now being further developed by TrialSpark’s subsidiary, High Line Bio (now Formation Bio), for the treatment of osteoarthritis. FGF18 and sprifermin act via the Fibroblast Growth Factor Receptor (FGFR) family, with preferential activity via FGFR3c.

== Osteoarthritis ==
In 2020, Merck reported 5-year follow-up data from the Phase 2 clinical trial for knee osteoarthritis (OA). The placebo controlled, multi-center study demonstrated that sprifermin was able to promote statistically significant improvement in cartilage thickness relative to control in a dose-dependent manner, meeting the primary endpoint of the study. The findings suggested the ability of FGF18 to arrest progression to joint replacement, with 0% of patients in the high dose group progressing to Total Knee Replacement (TKR) surgery over the 5 year study period; in contrast, nearly 1 in 10 patients of the high risk subgroup progressed to TKR when treated with the placebo. These findings suggest significant potential of FGF18 as a disease modifying drug for the treatment of OA (DMOAD) and warrant further clinical evaluation.

Sprifermin was well tolerated with no severe adverse events associated with the treatment. Long-term follow up showed that continual injections (up to 12 per year of bilateral treatment) may need to be sustained over a period of multiple years to prevent recurrence of cartilage loss. Improvement in WOMAC, a secondary endpoint, was met for the Subgroup at Risk. Subsequent analysis further demonstrated that a clinically meaningful reduction in the rate of symptomatic progression (WOMAC) was demonstrated in the full trial population and Subgroup at Risk by the high treatment dose.
