= Genicular artery embolization =

Medical treatment

Genicular artery embolization (GAE or geniculate artery embolization) is a minimally invasive image-guided procedure performed by interventional radiologists to relieve chronic knee pain caused by osteoarthritis or post-operative hemarthrosis.

== Technique and indications ==
The technique involves embolizing (blocking) small arteries around the knee, specifically the genicular arteries, to reduce inflammation and development of new blood vessels that may contribute to pain.

GAE is indicated for people having:

- Moderate to severe knee osteoarthritis (Kellgren–Lawrence grade 2-4)
- Persistent knee pain not responsive to conservative treatments (e.g., physiotherapy, NSAIDs, corticosteroid injections)
- Recurrent hemarthrosis after total knee arthroplasty
- People who are not suitable candidates for knee replacement surgery or prefer non-surgical management

== Mechanism and procedure ==
During the procedure, a catheter is inserted through a small puncture, typically in the femoral or radial artery, and advanced under fluoroscopic guidance to the arteries supplying the knee joint. Embolic agents (microspheres) are injected into the genicular arteries to block blood flow in small vessels, reducing reduce inflammation, synovial hyperplasia, and pain associated with chronic inflammation.

GAE is usually conducted as an outpatient procedure under local anesthesia, with duration between 1–2 hours. Patients can generally walk the same day and return to normal activities within 1–2 days. Post-procedural care involves monitoring for minor side effects, such as skin discoloration or transient pain.

== Research and risks ==
Clinical studies have demonstrated that GAE results in significant reductions in pain scores (e.g., visual analogue scale or WOMAC). It can also lead to improved functional ability and quality of life, with high patient satisfaction. Early intervention with GAE improves clinical outcomes. By 12 months post-procedure, 78% and 92% of patients meet the clinical threshold for significant pain reduction by visual analog scale and total WOMAC score, respectively. Significant pain reductions may be sustained in patients for at least two years following a single GAE procedure.

Although generally safe, the procedure carries risks, including skin discoloration or bruising, temporary numbness or tingling, and rare instances of non-target embolization (where embolic material is inadvertently deposited in unintended vessels or organs). Overall risks are very low and are comparable to other minimally invasive angiographic procedures such as hemorrhoidal artery embolization (HAE, or hemorrhoid embolization).

== See also ==
- Embolization
- Knee osteoarthritis
- Interventional radiology
