= Disease-modifying osteoarthritis drug =

Research area in which no drugs are currently approved

A disease-modifying osteoarthritis drug (DMOAD) is a disease-modifying drug that would inhibit or even reverse the progression of osteoarthritis. Since the main hallmark of osteoarthritis is cartilage loss, a typical DMOAD would prevent the loss of cartilage and potentially regenerate it. Other DMOADs may attempt to help repair adjacent tissues by reducing inflammation. A successful DMOAD would be expected to show an improvement in patient pain and function with an improvement of the health of the joint tissues.

== Approved for human use ==
There are currently no DMOADs approved for human use.

== Drugs with undergoing human trials ==
Drug	Mechanism of Action	Status	Investigator(s)
TPX-100 (Matrix Extracellular Phosphoglycoprotein)	23-amino acid peptide that induces articular cartilage formation reduces pathological shape change of joint bones.	In 2021, OrthoTrophix, the developer of the drug, reported that a one-year study of 93 patients suggested that TPX-100 treatment was associated with significant and sustained improvements in critical knee functions, preservation of knee cartilage thickness, reduced pathologic changes in the underlying bone, and a >60% decrease in the use of pain medications. In late 2023, the company licensed TPX-100 to American Reagent in the US for an undisclosed amount.	Orthotrophix American Reagent
AKL4 / APPA	Oral NFkB and Nrf2 modulator	National Institute for Health Research (NIHR)-approved Phase I study completed 1Q 2020. Phase 2 150-patient started 4Q 2020 with NBCD (Nordic Bioscience) and is due to complete 3Q 2021.	AKL Research & Development
SM04690 / Lorecivivint	CLK2/DYRK1A inhibitor and Wnt pathway modulator	Phase 2 study was completed, and pain, function, and joint space width improvement were observed. Phase 3 study started in May 2019. In May 2020, it was reported that the phase 2a trial failed to meet the primary endpoint. But a phase 2b trial in early 2021 met the primary endpoint. In January 2026, Biosplice submitted a New Drug Application (NDA) to the FDA following Phase 3 OA-07 results demonstrating statistically significant improvements in pain, function, and medial joint space width compared to placebo, with a safety profile similar to placebo across over 1,800 patients.	Biosplice Therapeutics
KA34 / Kartogenin	Induces MSCs to differentiate into chondrocytes via its lytic product 4-aminobiphenyl (known as a carcinogen)	Phase 1 study started in May 2018 to evaluate safety of kartogenin in humans.	Calibr
UBX0101 (Senolytic agents)	p53/MDM2 inhibitor, induces apoptosis of senescent cells to create a favourable healing environment	Phase 1 study complete in June 2019, results were encouraging leading to plans for a phase 2 study. Phase 2 study results showed no improvements, which led to the drug being discontinued from the investigation.	Unity Biotechnology
BMP7(Bone Morphogenetic Protein 7)	Supports transcription of osteogenic genes	Phase 1 study completed in 2010. Phase 2 study completed in 2015, with the company claiming that the data suggested the ability to prevent cartilage loss. As of 2024, the Ember Therapeutics website is down, and Google indicates that the company is permanently closed.	Ember Therapeutics
FGF-18 / Sprifermin	Promote chondrogenesis through fibroblast growth factor receptor FGFR3	Phase 2 study completed in 2017 and 5 year follow-up published in 2021, demonstrated clear dose- and frequency-dependent improvements in cartilage thickness (primary endpoint), complete arrest in progression to joint replacement (in the high dose treatment groups), and improvements in the WOMAC pain survey for high-risk patients (secondary endpoint). Subsequent analysis additionally demonstrated statistically significant and clinically meaningful improvements in WOMAC progression for the high-dose treatment groups relative to placebo.	Formation Bio Merck Nordic Bioscience
LNA043	Chondrogenesis enhancer	Phase 1 study started in 2015.	Novartis
GLPG1972 (Proteinases Inhibitors)	ADAMTS-5 inhibitor	Phase 1 study completed in 2019. Phase 2 study started in 2019. In October 2020, Servier reported phase 2 trial failed.	Galapagos
M6495	ADAMTS-5 inhibitor	Phase 1 safety study completed.	Novartis
MIV-711 (Cathepsin K inhibitors)	Cathepsin K inhibitor	Phase 2 study completed in 2019 showed the prevention of cartilage damage but did not show a reduction in patient pain.	Medivir
Invossa-K (Transforming Growth Factor- β)	Cell/Gene therapy	Human studies halted by FDA for false ingredient claim. There are claims FDA allowed for phase 3 trials to resume in the US. As of January 2022, phase 3 clinical trial has resumed in the US.	Kolon Life Science
Amniotic fluid allograft (ReNU, Palingen InovoFlo, AmnioFix, Clarix Flo)	Note: Amniotic fluid is not a single drug and instead contains around 226 growth factors, including BMP7. Inflammation reducer and cartilage growth enhancer.	The initial six patient studies in 2015 showed improved pain and function. A randomised controlled trial of 200 patients completed in 2019, also showing improved pain and function. A 2019 non-randomized study of 20 patients showed improvement in joint tissue health.	Organogenesis Amnio Technology MiMedx Amniox Medical, Inc.
Polysulfate Sodium (PPS)	Pentosan Polysulfate Sodium (PPS) is a semi-synthetic drug manufactured from European beech xylans that are sulfated to produce a negatively charged product that mimics glycosaminoglycans (GAGs).	Paradigm's IND application to commence its phase 3 pivotal clinical trial investigating Pentosan Polysulphate Sodium (PPS) for the treatment of pain associated with knee osteoarthritis has been cleared by the US FDA. Approximately 65 sites have been identified throughout the US and Australia. Contracting with many of those sites has been completed. The first four sites in Australia have initiated screening participants. Screening at the US sites is expected to begin before the end of CY2021. The Company is now in a position to accelerate recruitment by adding approximately 10 sites in the United Kingdom (UK) and Europe, with site initiation and subject screening expected to commence in 1H CY 2022.	Paradigm Biopharmaceuticals (ASX:PAR)

== Drugs under investigation ==
Drug	Mechanism of Action	Status	Investigator(s)
MF-300 (15-PGDH inhibitor)	15-hydroxyprostaglandin dehydrogenase (15-PGDH) inhibitor; restores tissue PGE2 levels	Phase 1 study for sarcopenia completed September 2025, demonstrating safety and dose-dependent target engagement in 70 healthy volunteers. Ex vivo studies using human osteoarthritic cartilage from knee replacement surgery demonstrated reduced degradation markers and initiation of articular cartilage regeneration. Preclinical mouse studies showed restoration of aged knee cartilage thickness and prevention of post-traumatic OA following ACL injury. OA-specific human trials planned.	Empirium Bio
A2M	Protect chondrocytes from damage	A2M inhibited catabolic activity in rats. Note: Cytonics offers autologous A2M therapy in humans but no randomised human trials have been published to date. A human trial is underway at NYU.	Cytonics
SS-31	Mitoprotective peptide	Study done on two horses showed protective effects in vivo.	Cornell
TD-198946	Chondrogenic factor	Basic science studies being carried out.	University of Tokyo
M6495	ADAMTS-5 inhibitor	Shown to protect against cartilage breakdown in cartilage and synovial joint tissue explant models	Merck
B001-5	ADAMTS-5 and ADAM-17 inhibitor	To be submitted to the FDA in early 2020.	Guangzhou Institutes of Biomedicine and Health

Gene therapy for osteoarthritis is also being investigated as technology to create a drug that would act as a disease-modifying drug. Several approved drugs are being investigated as repurposed agents in the treatment of osteoarthritis such as liraglutide (anti-diabetic and anti-obesity drug: NCT02905864), Metformin (anti-diabetic drug: NCT04767841, NCT05034029), Zoledronic acid (anti-osteoporotic drug: NCT04303026), etc.

Paroxetine has been deemed to have DMOAD activity.
