= Charles Jacques Bouchard =

French pathologist

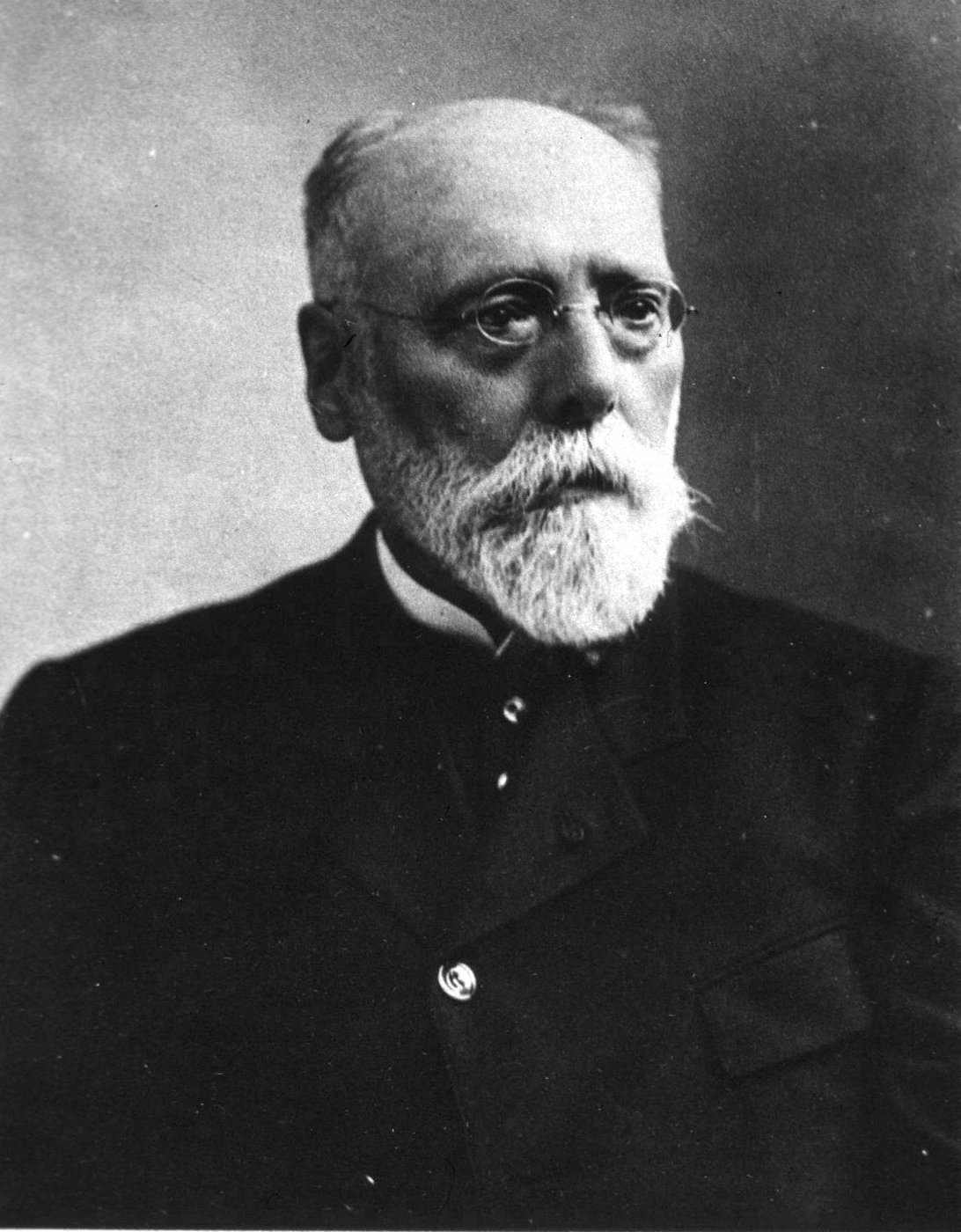
Charles Jacques Bouchard (1837–1915)

Charles Jacques Bouchard (6 September 1837 – 28 October 1915) was a French pathologist and an esperantist born in Montier-en-Der, a commune the department of Haute-Marne.

== Biography ==
He studied medicine in Lyon and Paris, where he obtained his doctorate in 1866. In 1874 he became a physician at Bicêtre Hospital, and in 1879 was appointed chair of general pathology. In 1886, he became a member of the Academie de Médecine.

Bouchard is remembered for his work with infectious and nutritional diseases. He was a student of Jean Charcot at the Pitié-Salpêtrière Hospital, and with Charcot described a disorder that would later be known as a "Charcot-Bouchard aneurysm". It is described as a small aneurysm on cerebral perforated vessels that could be the cause of intracranial hemorrhages. Bouchard wrote about the aneurysm in his doctorate thesis Étude sur quelques points de la pathogénie des hémorrhagies cérébrales. Bouchard promoted a theory of intestinal autointoxication.

His name is also lent to the eponymous "Bouchard's nodes", which are bony outgrowths of the proximal interphalangeal joints, and are a sign of osteoarthritis.

== Selected publications ==
He was the author of Traité de Pathologie Générale, a compendium of medical pathology, and also "Lectures on Auto-Intoxication in Disease, or Self-Poisoning of the Individual". Other noted writings by Bouchard are as follows:

- Études expérimentales sur l'identité de l'herpès circiné et de l'herpès tonsurant, 1860
- Des dégenerations secondaires de la moëlle épinière, 1866
- Étude sur quelques points de la pathogénie des hémorrhagies cérébrales, 1866
- Les auto-intoxications, 1866 translated as Lectures on auto-intoxication in disease, 1894
- De la pathogénie des hémorrhagies, 1869
- Questions relatives à la reforme des études médicales, 1907.
