= Heberden's node =

- Heberden's nodes on the 2nd (index) finger of the right hand
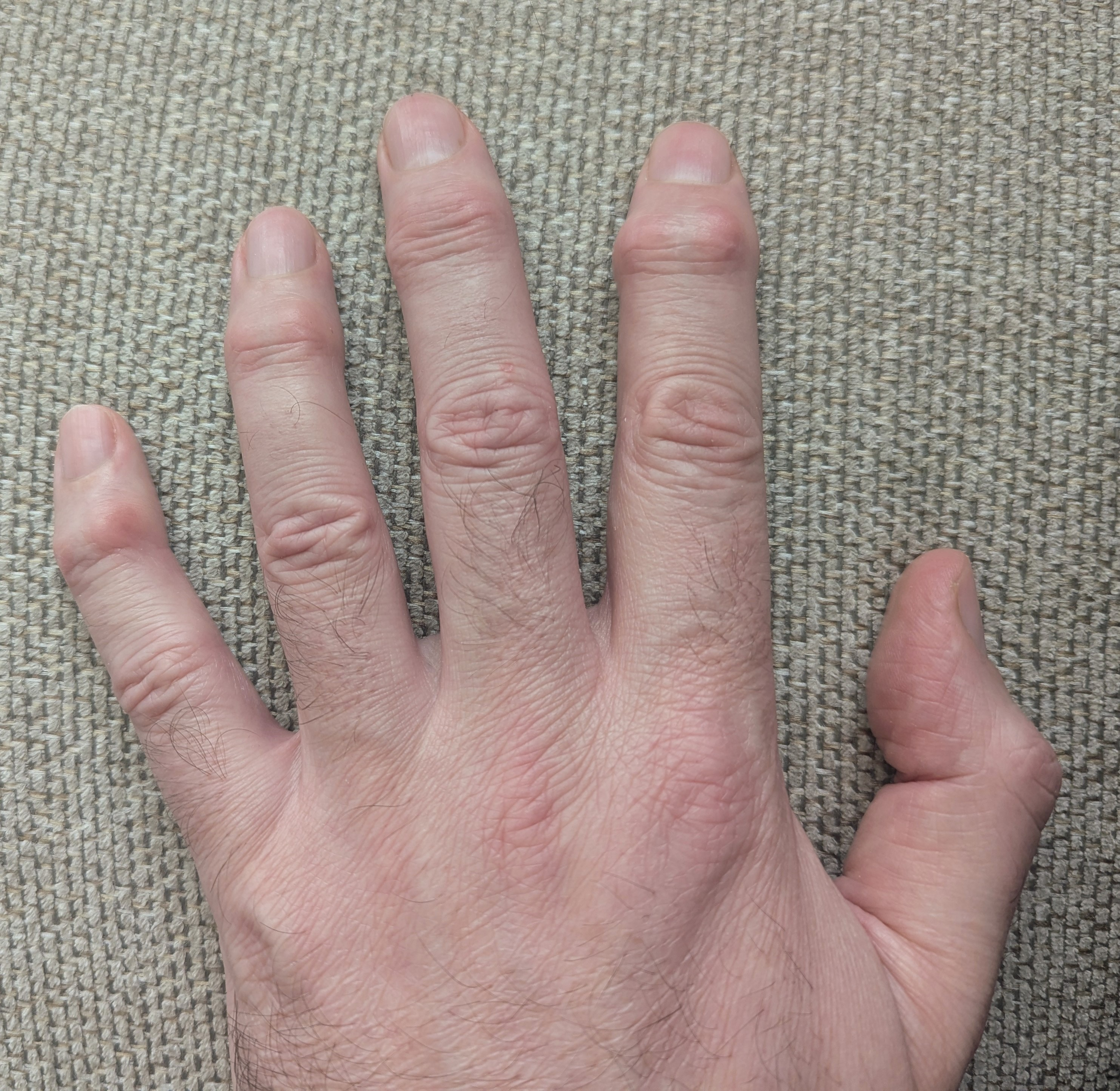
- Nodes and deformation on the 2nd and 5th fingers of a 48 year old male patient
- Specialty: Rheumatology

Heberden's nodes are hard or bony swellings that can develop in the distal interphalangeal joints (DIP) (the joints closest to the end of the fingers and toes). They are a sign of osteoarthritis and are caused by formation of osteophytes (calcific spurs) of the articular (joint) cartilage in response to repeated trauma at the joint.

Heberden's nodes typically develop in middle age, beginning either with a chronic swelling of the affected joints or the sudden painful onset of redness, numbness, and loss of manual dexterity. This initial inflammation and pain eventually subsides, and the patient is left with a permanent bony outgrowth that often skews the fingertip sideways. Bouchard's nodes may also be present; these are similar bony growths in the proximal interphalangeal (PIP) joints (middle joints of the fingers), and are also associated with osteoarthritis.

Heberden's nodes are more common in women than in men, and there seems to be a genetic component involved in pre-disposition to the condition.

== Eponym ==
They are named after William Heberden (1710–1801).

== See also ==
- Bouchard's nodes – Also present in martial artists, in particular judoka and Brazilian jiu-jitsu practitioners.
