= Fibroblast growth factor 18 =

Mammalian protein found in Homo sapiens

FGF18

Identifiers
- Aliases: FGF18, FGF-18, ZFGF5, fibroblast growth factor 18
- External IDs: OMIM: 603726; MGI: 1277980; GeneCards: FGF18
Available structures
PDB	Ortholog search: PDBe RCSB
PDB	List of PDB id codes 4CJM

Gene location (Human)
Chr.	Chromosome 5 (human)
Band	5q35.1	Start	171,419,647 bp
Band	5q35.1	End	171,457,626 bp

Gene location (Mouse)
Chr.	Chromosome 11 (mouse)
Band	11|11 A4	Start	33,067,430 bp
Band	11|11 A4	End	33,097,400 bp
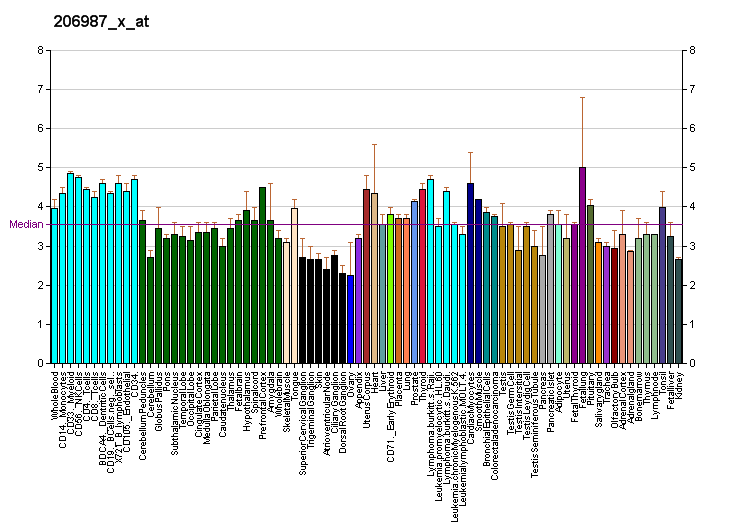

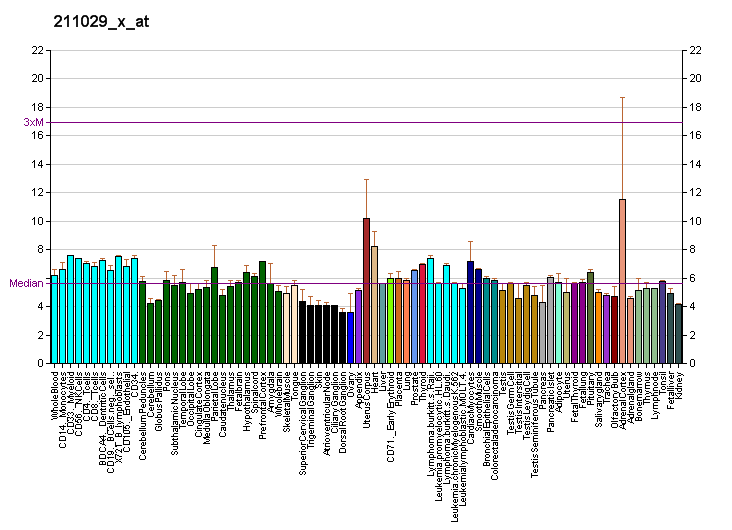

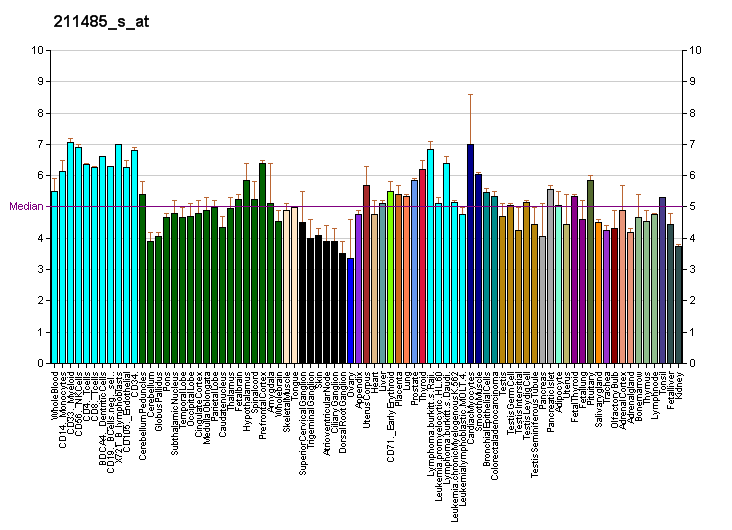
RNA expression pattern
Bgee	Human / Mouse (ortholog); Top expressed in: tendon of biceps brachii; right ventricle; vena cava; myocardium of left ventricle; cartilage tissue; apex of heart; buccal mucosa cell; parietal pleura; gonad; endothelial cell / Top expressed in: tail of embryo; internal carotid artery; aortic valve; external carotid artery; hair; facial motor nucleus; deep cerebellar nuclei; coronal suture; trigeminal ganglion; morula; More reference expression data
BioGPS	More reference expression data
Gene ontology
Molecular function	fibroblast growth factor receptor binding; type 1 fibroblast growth factor receptor binding; type 2 fibroblast growth factor receptor binding; growth factor activity; protein tyrosine kinase activity; phosphatidylinositol-4,5-bisphosphate 3-kinase activity; 1-phosphatidylinositol-3-kinase activity
Cellular component	extracellular region; nucleolus; extracellular space
Biological process	intramembranous ossification; positive regulation of vascular endothelial growth factor receptor signaling pathway; regulation of sprouting angiogenesis; positive regulation of endothelial cell chemotaxis to fibroblast growth factor; positive regulation of MAP kinase activity; ossification; lung development; cell-cell signaling; anatomical structure morphogenesis; chondrocyte development; endochondral ossification; MAPK cascade; fibroblast growth factor receptor signaling pathway; positive regulation of chondrocyte differentiation; angiogenesis; positive regulation of cell population proliferation; regulation of endothelial cell proliferation; signal transduction; phosphatidylinositol phosphate biosynthetic process; peptidyl-tyrosine phosphorylation; phosphatidylinositol-3-phosphate biosynthetic process; regulation of signaling receptor activity; positive regulation of protein kinase B signaling; positive regulation of blood vessel endothelial cell migration; positive regulation of angiogenesis; positive regulation of ERK1 and ERK2 cascade
Sources:Amigo / QuickGO
Orthologs
Databases	NCBI: entry; OMA: entry
Species	Human	Mouse
Entrez	8817	14172
Ensembl	ENSG00000156427	ENSMUSG00000057967
UniProt	O76093	O89101
RefSeq (mRNA)	NM_033649; NM_003862	NM_008005
RefSeq (protein)	NP_003853	NP_032031
Location (UCSC)	Chr 5: 171.42 – 171.46 Mb	Chr 11: 33.07 – 33.1 Mb
PubMed search
- Wikidata
View/Edit Human	View/Edit Mouse

Fibroblast growth factor 18 (FGF-18) is a protein that is encoded by the FGF18 gene in humans. The protein was first discovered in 1998, when two newly-identified murine genes Fgf17 and Fgf18 were described and confirmed as being closely related by sequence homology to Fgf8. The three proteins were eventually grouped into the FGF8 subfamily, which contains several of the endocrine FGF superfamily members FGF8, FGF17, and FGF18. Subsequent studies identified FGF18's role in promoting chondrogenesis, and an apparent specific activity for the generation of the hyaline cartilage in articular joints.

The protein encoded by this gene is a member of the fibroblast growth factor (FGF) family. FGF family members possess broad mitogenic and cell survival activities, and are involved in a variety of biological processes, including embryonic development, cell growth, morphogenesis, and tissue repair. It has been shown in vitro that this protein is able to induce the outgrowth of neurites in PC12 cells.

== Function ==
FGF18 signals through fibroblast growth factor receptor (FGFR) family, preferentially binding FGFR 3c (followed by 4△, 2c, 1c, and finally 3b), signaling via FGFR3 promotes generation of cartilage (chondrogenesis). FGF18 and has been shown to cause thickening of cartilage in a murine model of osteoarthritis, and the recombinant version of it (sprifermin) is in a clinical trial as a potential treatment for osteoarthritis (OA). Recent findings from a placebo-controlled randomized clinical study demonstrate the potential of FGF18 to reduce the rate of progression to joint replacement surgery and delay progression of OA-related pain (WOMAC). Another study suggested the ability of FGF18 to inhibit intravertebral disc degeneration in a rabbit model of the disease.

Studies of the similar proteins in mouse and chick suggested that this protein is a pleiotropic growth factor that stimulates proliferation in a number of tissues, most notably the liver and small intestine. Knockout studies of the similar gene in mice implied the role of this protein in regulating proliferation and differentiation of midline cerebellar structures.

FGF18 appears to be a pleiotropic factor, expressed in a broad range of tissues and organs; the highest level of FGF18 expression were confirmed in the right ventricle interventricular septum of the heart. The role of FGF18 in the heart appears to be associated with protection from stress-induced pathological cardiac hypertrophy via the induction of survival or regenerative signals. Similarly, studies confirmed that overexpression of FGF18 in the liver was able to attenuate liver fibrosis following chemically-induced injury.

Studies of FGF18 in relation to oncology have shown both decreased levels and increased levels of FGF18 in a number of cancer types and stages, however, FGF18 does not appear to be causative or prognostic and long-term clinical studies of the FGF18 analog, sprifermin, have demonstrated an excellent safety profile with no reported oncogenic effects.
