= Enthesophyte =

Abnormal bone growth at a tendon or ligament

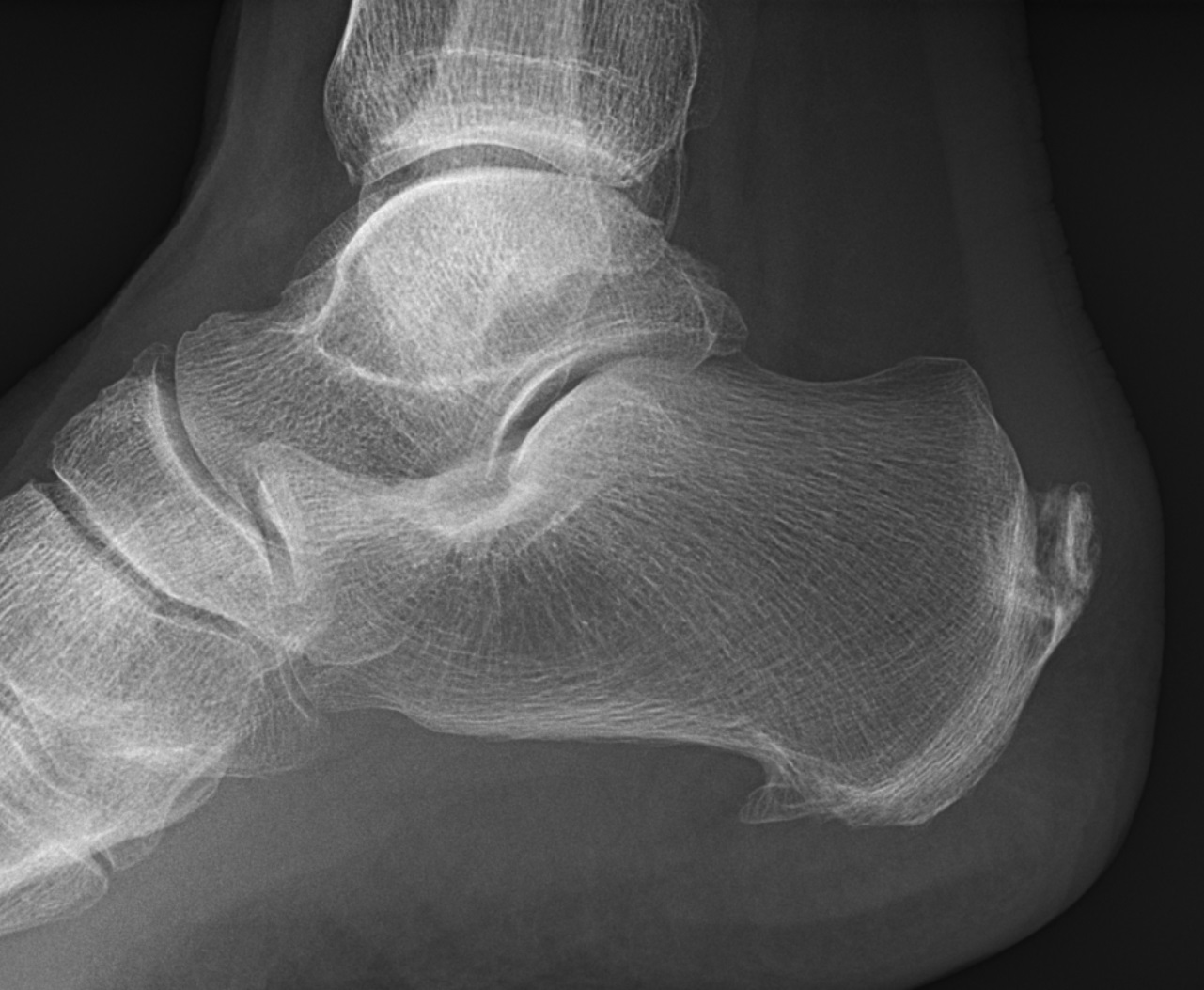
An enthesophyte, consisting of calcification deposits within the Achilles tendon at its calcaneal insertion. The Achilles tendon is wider than normal, further suggesting inflammation.

Enthesophytes are abnormal bony projections at the attachment of a tendon or ligament. They are not to be confused with osteophytes, which are abnormal bony projections in joint spaces. Enthesophytes and osteophytes are bone responses for stress.

== See also ==
- Haglund's syndrome
