= Radiographic classification of osteoarthritis =

- Purpose: Quantify the degree of osteoarthritis
- Based on: Medical imaging

Radiographic systems to classify osteoarthritis vary by which joint is being investigated. In osteoarthritis, the choice of treatment is based on pain and decreased function, but radiography can be useful before surgery in order to prepare for the procedure.

== Vertebral column ==
There are many grading systems for degeneration of intervertebral discs and facet joints in the cervical and lumbar vertebrae, of which the following radiographic systems can be recommended in terms of interobserver reliability:

- Kellgren grading of cervical disc degeneration
- Kellgren grading of cervical facet joint degeneration
- Lane grading of lumbar disc degeneration
- Thompson grading of lumbar disc degeneration (by magnetic resonance imaging)
- Pathria grading of lumbar facet joint degeneration (by computed tomography)
- Weishaupt grading of lumbar facet joint degeneration (by MRI and computed tomography)

Kellgren grading of cervical disc degeneration
I	Minimal anterior osteophytosis
II	Definite anterior osteophytosis; Possible disc space narrowing; Some endplate sclerosis
III	Moderate disc space narrowing; Definite endplate sclerosis; Osteophytosis
IV	Severe disc space narrowing; Endplate sclerosis; Multiple large osteophytes.

Lane grading of lumbar disc degeneration
Grade	Joint space narrowing	Osteophytes	Sclerosis
0	None	None	None
1	Definite but mild narrowing	Small	Present
2	Moderate	Moderate	–
3	Severe (complete joint space loss)	Large	–

The Thomson grading system is regarded to have more academic than clinical value.

Thomson grading of lumbar disc degeneration
Grade	Nucleus	Anulus	Endplate	Vertebral body
I	Bulging gel	Discrete fibrous laminae	Hyaline, uniform thickness	Rounded margins
II	Peripheral white fibrous tissue	Mucinous material between laminae	Irregular thickness	Pointed margins
III	Consolidated fibrous tissue	Extensive mucinous infiltration; loss of annular-nuclear demarcation	Focal defects in cartilage	Small chondrophytes or osteophytes at margins
IV	Horizontal clefts parallel to endplate	Focal disruptions	Fibrocartilage extending from subchondral bone; irregularity and focal sclerosis in subchondral bone	Osteophytes smaller than 2 mm
V	Clefts extended through nucleus and annulus		Diffuse sclerosis	Osteophytes greater than 2 mm

== Shoulder ==
The Samilson–Prieto classification is preferable for osteoarthritis of the glenohumeral joint.

Samilson–Prieto classification
Grade	Description
Mild	Exostosis of inferior humerus and/or glenoid measuring less than 3 mm
Moderate	Exostosis of inferior humerus and/or glenoid measuring 3–7 mm, and slight irregularity of the joint
Severe	Exostosis of inferior humerus and/or glenoid measuring more than 7 mm in height as well as sclerosis and narrowing of the joint space (normal joint space is 4–5 mm).

== Hip ==
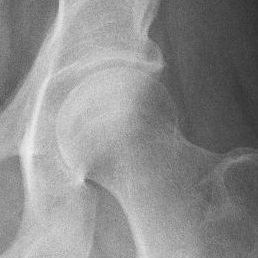
Hip joint with no signs of osteoarthritis.

The most commonly used radiographic classification system for osteoarthritis of the hip joint is the Kellgren–Lawrence system (or KL system). It uses plain radiographs.

Kellgren–Lawrence system
Grade	Description
0	No radiographic features of osteoarthritis
1	Possible joint space narrowing (normal joint space is at least 2 mm at the superior acetabulum) and osteophyte formation
2	Definite osteophyte formation with possible joint space narrowing
3	Multiple osteophytes, definite joint space narrowing, sclerosis and possible bony deformity
4	Large osteophytes, marked joint space narrowing, severe sclerosis and definite bony deformity

Osteoarthritis of the hip joint may also be graded by Tönnis classification. There is no consensus whether it is more or less reliable than the Kellgren-Lawrence system.

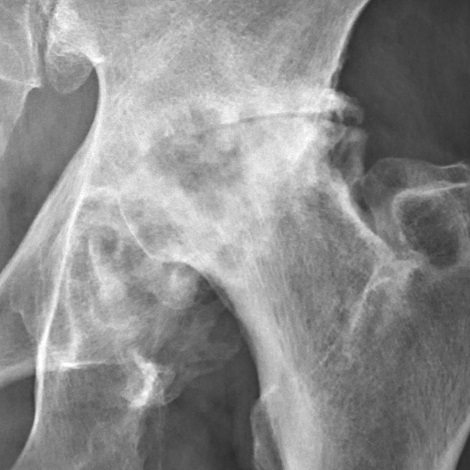
Severe (Tönnis grade 3) osteoarthritis of the hip.

Tönnis classification
Grade	Description
0	No osteoarthritis signs
1	Mild: increased osteosclerosis; minor joint space narrowing (normal joint space is at least 2 mm at the superior acetabulum); no or minor loss of head sphericity
2	Moderate: small bone cyst; moderate joint space narrowing; moderate loss of head sphericity
3	Severe: large bone cysts; severe joint space narrowing, or joint space obliteration; severe deformity of the head

== Knee ==
For the grading of osteoarthritis in the knee, the International Knee Documentation Committee (IKDC) system is regarded to have the most favorable combination of interobserver precision and correlation to knee arthroscopy findings. It was formed by a group of knee surgeons from Europe and America who met in 1987 to develop a standard form to measure results of knee ligament reconstructions.

The Ahlbäck system has been found to have comparable interobserver precision and arthroscopy correlation to the IKDC system, but most of the span of the Ahlbäck system focused at various degrees of bone defect or loss, and it is therefore less useful in early osteoarthritis. Systems that have been found to have lower interobserver precision and/or arthroscopy correlation are those developed by Kellgren and Lawrence, Fairbank, Brandt, and Jäger and Wirth.

International Knee Documentation Committee (IKDC) system
Grade	Findings
A	No joint space narrowing, defined in this system as at least 4 mm joint space
B	At least 4 mm joint space, but small osteophytes, slight sclerosis, or femoral condyle flattening
C	2–4 mm joint space
D	< 2 mm joint space

Ahlbäck classification
Grade	Findings
I	Joint space narrowing, with or without subchondral sclerosis. Joint space narrowing is defined by this system as a joint space less than 3 mm, or less than half of the space in the other compartment, or less than half of the space of the homologous compartment of the other knee.
II	Obliteration of the joint space
III	Bone defect/loss < 5 mm
IV	Bone defect/loss between 5 and 10 mm
V	Bone defect/loss > 10 mm, often with subluxation and arthritis of the other compartment

For the patellofemoral joint, a classification by Merchant 1974 uses a 45° "skyline" view of the patella:

Merchant system
Stage	Description
1 (mild)	Patellofemoral joint space > 3 mm
2 (moderate)	Joint space < 3 mm but no bony contact
3 (severe)	Bony surfaces in contact over less than one quarter of the joint surface
4 (very severe)	Bony contact throughout the entire joint surface

== Other joints ==
- In the temporomandibular joint, subchondral sclerosis of the mandibular condyle has been described as an early change, condylar flattening as a feature of progressive osteoarthritis, and narrowing of the temporomandibular joint space as a late stage change. A joint space of between 1.5 and 4 mm is regarded as normal.

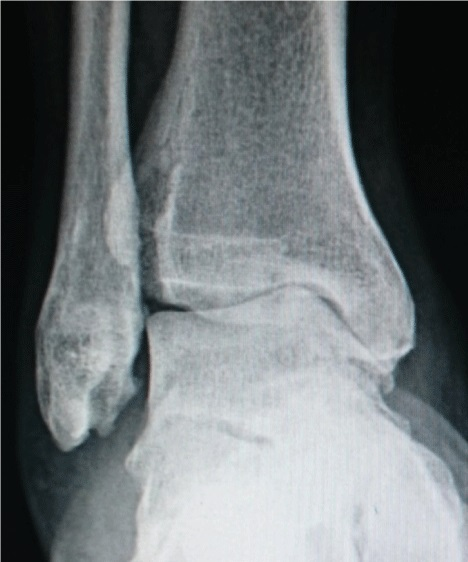
Ankle osteoarthritis.

- For the ankle, the Kellgren–Lawrence scale, as described for the hip, has been recommended. The distances between the bones in the ankle are normally as follows:

- Talus - medial malleolus: 1.70 ± 0.13 mm
- Talus - tibial plafond: 2.04 ± 0.29 mm
- Talus - lateral malleolus: 2.13 ± 0.20 mm

== See also ==
- WOMAC, a non-radiographic classification system of osteoarthritis, taking into account pain, stiffness and functional limitation.
