= Disease-modifying treatment =

Medical treatment that alters disease progression

A disease-modifying drug, or disease-modifying therapy, is a treatment that delays, slows or reverses the progression of a disease by targeting its underlying cause. They are distinguished from symptomatic treatments that treat the symptoms of a disease but do not address its underlying cause.

== Examples ==
- Disease-modifying osteoarthritis drug
- Disease-modifying antirheumatic drug
