= Bouchard's nodes =

- Specialty: Rheumatology

Bouchard's nodes are hard, bony outgrowths or gelatinous cysts on the proximal interphalangeal joints (the middle joints of fingers or toes). They are seen in osteoarthritis, where they are caused by the formation of calcific spurs of the articular (joint) cartilage.

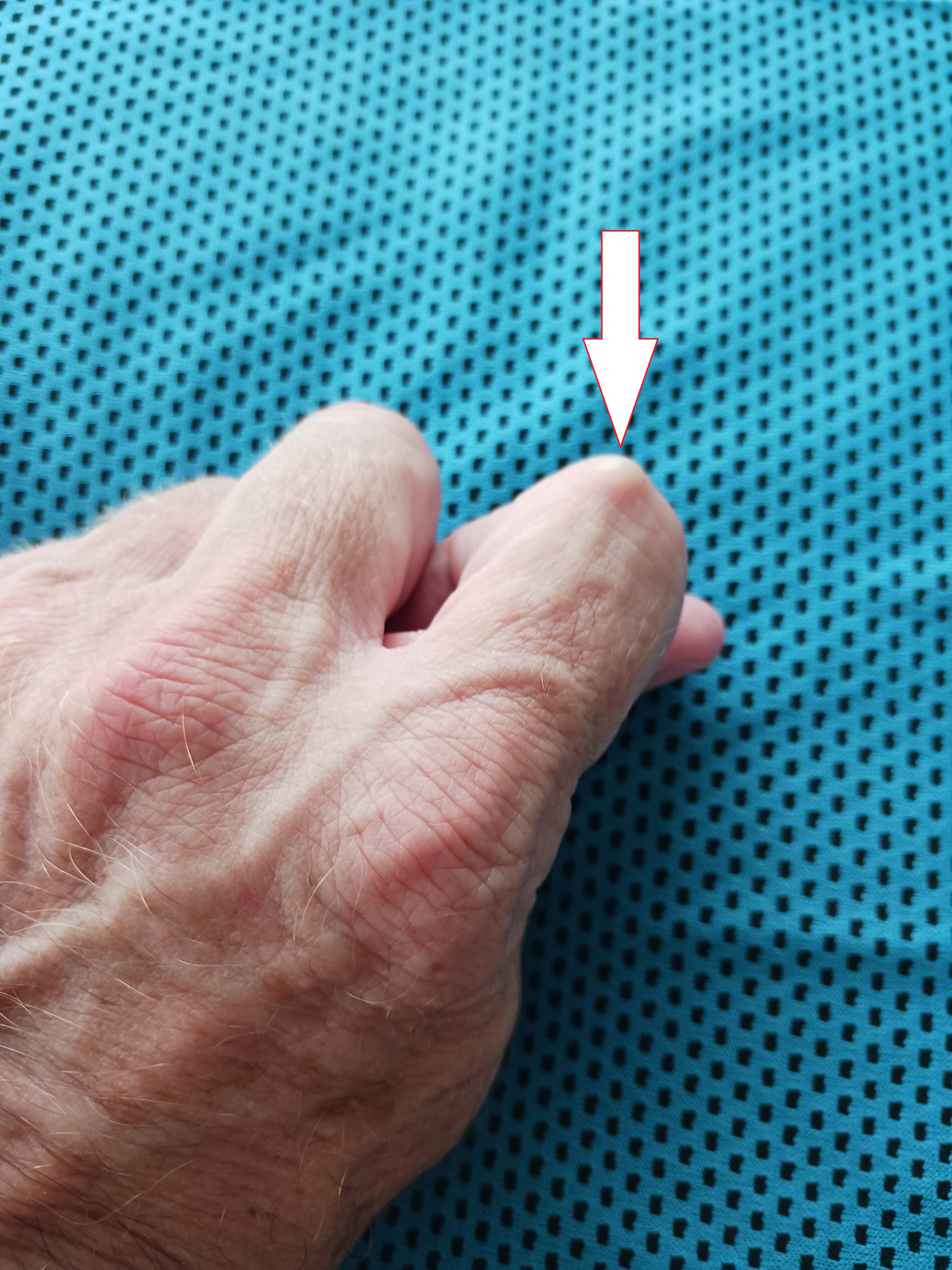
A Bouchard's node on the proximal interphalangeal joint of the index finger of a 64 year old man.

Bouchard's nodes are comparable in presentation to Heberden's nodes, which are similar osteoarthritic growths on the distal interphalangeal joints, but are significantly less common.

== Eponym ==
Bouchard's nodes are named after French pathologist Charles Jacques Bouchard (1837–1915).
