= Osteophyte =

Small abnormal bony outgrowth

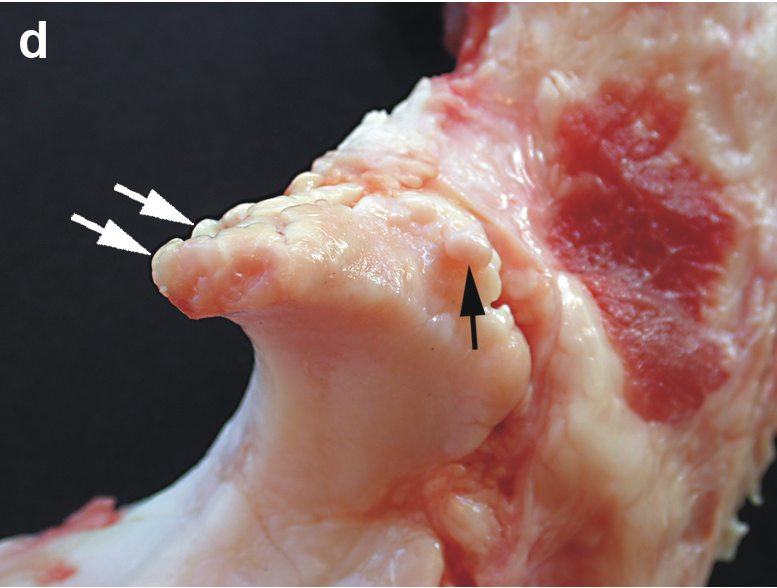
- Small marginal osteophytes (arrows) of the processus anconeus of the ulna can be seen in this gross pathological specimen of a sow.
- Specialty: Orthopedics

Osteophytes are exostoses (bony projections) that form along joint margins. They are distinct from enthesophytes, which are bony projections that form at the attachment of a tendon or ligament. Osteophytes are not always distinguished from exostoses in any definite way, although in many cases there are a number of differences. Osteophytes are typically intra-articular (within the joint capsule).

== Cause ==
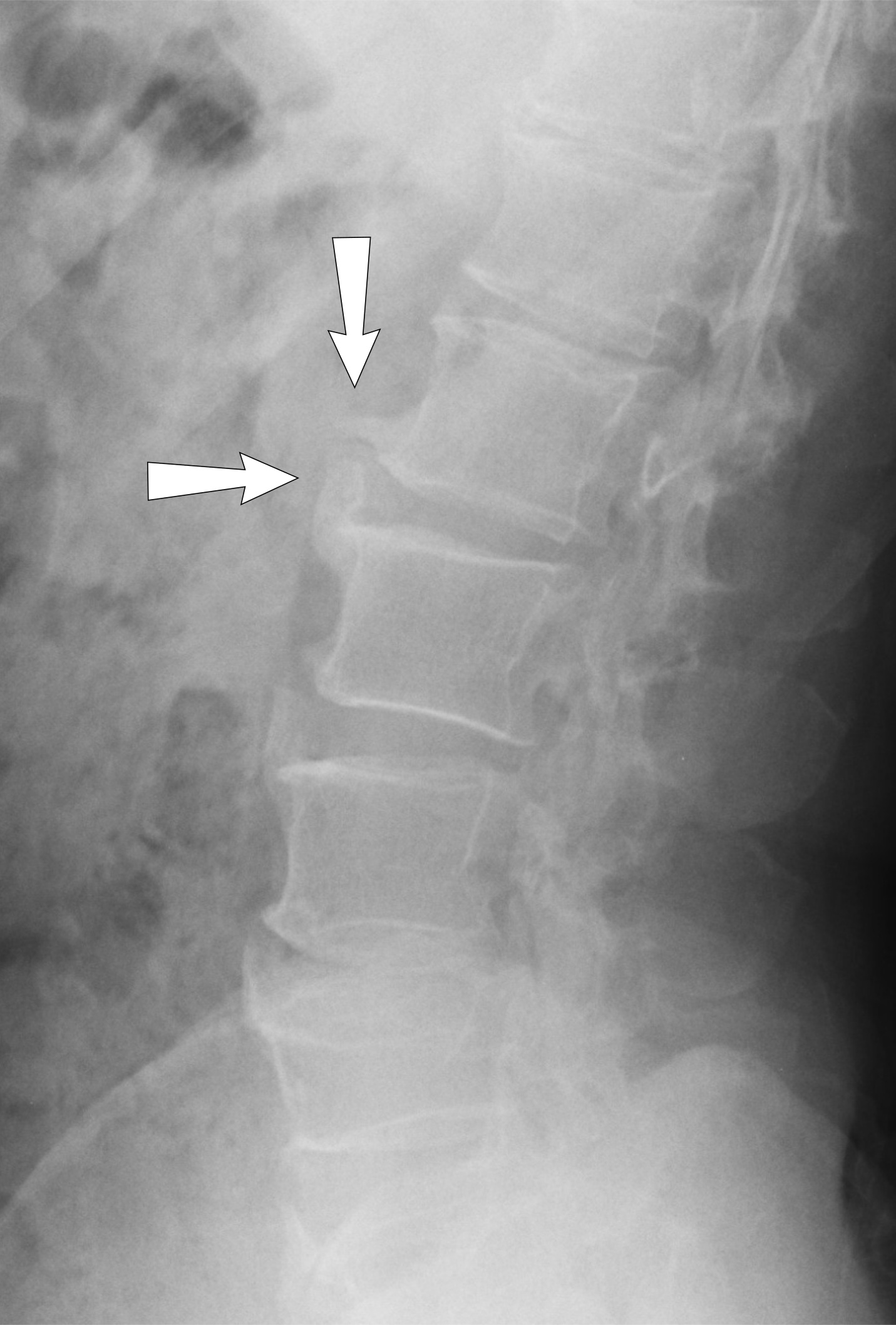
X-ray showing osteophytes of spondylosis of the lumbar spine

A range of bone-formation processes are associated with aging, degeneration, mechanical instability, and disease (such as diffuse idiopathic skeletal hyperostosis). Osteophyte formation has classically been related to sequential and consequential changes in such processes. Often osteophytes form in osteoarthritic joints as a result of damage and wear from inflammation. Calcification and new bone formation can also occur in response to mechanical damage in joints.

== Pathophysiology ==
Osteophytes form because of the increase in a damaged joint's surface area. This is most common from the onset of arthritis. Osteophytes usually limit joint movement and typically cause pain.

Osteophytes form naturally on the back of the spine as a person ages and are a clinical sign of degeneration in the spine. In this case, the osteophytes are commonly not the source of back pains, but instead are a sign of an underlying problem. However, osteophytes on the spine can impinge on nerves that leave the spine for other parts of the body. This impingement can cause pain in both upper and lower limbs and a numbness or tingling sensations in the hands and feet because the nerves are supplying sensation to their dermatomes.

Osteophytes on the fingers or toes are known as Heberden's nodes (if on the distal interphalangeal joint) or Bouchard's nodes (if on the proximal interphalangeal joints).

== Treatments ==
Normally, asymptomatic cases are not treated. Non-steroidal anti-inflammatory drugs and surgery are two typical options for cases requiring treatment.
