= WOMAC =

Diagnostic questionnaire in orthopaedics

- Purpose: evaluate an individual's osteoarthritis

The Western Ontario and McMaster Universities Osteoarthritis Index (WOMAC) is a widely used, proprietary set of standardized questionnaires used by health professionals to evaluate the condition of patients with osteoarthritis of the knee and hip, including pain, stiffness, and physical functioning of the joints. The WOMAC has also been used to assess back pain, rheumatoid arthritis, juvenile rheumatoid arthritis, systemic lupus erythematosus, and fibromyalgia. It can be self-administered and was developed at Western Ontario and McMaster Universities in 1982.

Higher scores indicate worse pain, stiffness, and functional limitations. The WOMAC measures five items for pain (score range 0–20), two for stiffness (score range 0–8), and 17 for functional limitation (score range 0–68). Physical functioning questions cover everyday activities such as stair use, standing up from a sitting or lying position, standing, bending, walking, getting in and out of a car, shopping, putting on or taking off socks, lying in bed, getting in or out of a bath, sitting, and heavy and light household duties. The questions on the WOMAC are a subset of the questions of the Hip disability and osteoarthritis outcome score (HOOS). Thus, a HOOS survey may also be used to determine a WOMAC score.

A WOMAC test takes about 12 minutes, but is also available in a short form, (although this has not been as extensively tested as the full version). Versions of the WOMAC have also been developed that can be used in telephone or online surveys.

It has been translated into more than 65 languages.

The American College of Rheumatology notes that the test-retest reliability of the WOMAC varies for the pain, stiffness, and function subscales. The ACR says the pain subscale "has been variable across studies but generally meets the minimum standard." Reliability for the physical function scale "has been more consistent and stronger... but the stiffness subscale has shown low test-retest reliability." When used in clinical studies, the WOMAC pain and function subscales perform comparably or better than other tests in being responsive to change from experimental interventions, but this varies for the different subscales and types of intervention.

An example of an arthritis study using the WOMAC found a significant exposure–response relationship between body weight loss (or gain) and clinically significant improvements (or declines) in WOMAC function and pain for people with osteoarthritis of the knee.

== See also ==
- Kellgren-Lawrence grading scale
