= Alexander Klibanov =

Alexander Klibanov may refer to:

- Alexander Klibanov (biologist), professor of biology at the University of Virginia
- Alexander Klibanov (chemist), professor of chemistry and bioengineering at the Massachusetts Institute of Technology
