= Voluson 730 =

Diagnostic ultrasound machine

The Voluson 730 is a diagnostic ultrasound machine known for its 3D and 4D imaging in obstetric and gynecological applications.

== Early development ==
The Voluson 730 was built upon technology developed in the 1980s by Kretztechnik, a company in Austria. Medison, an ultrasound manufacturer in South Korea purchased the Voluson line from Kretz and further developed it into the Voluson 530, then the Voluson 730.

== Development by General Electric ==
General Electric later purchased the Voluson 730 from Medison and continued to develop it, releasing it in May 2002 as Revision 1.05. Versions previous to 1.05 were produced by Medison. GE gave the Voluson 730 a distinctive industrial design based upon a circular work area colored blue, making it stand out considerably from other more staid looking designs of the time. GE continued to improve the Voluson 730 developing it up to Revision: BT08. GE ran ads heavily promoting the Voluson 730's 4D "babyface" capabilities and making it one of the most widely known ultrasound machines in the OB/GYN field. As of October 2011, GE still produces the Voluson 730 though it has created several upgraded successors such as the Voluson E6, Voluson E8, Voluson S6, and S8.

== Clinical applications ==
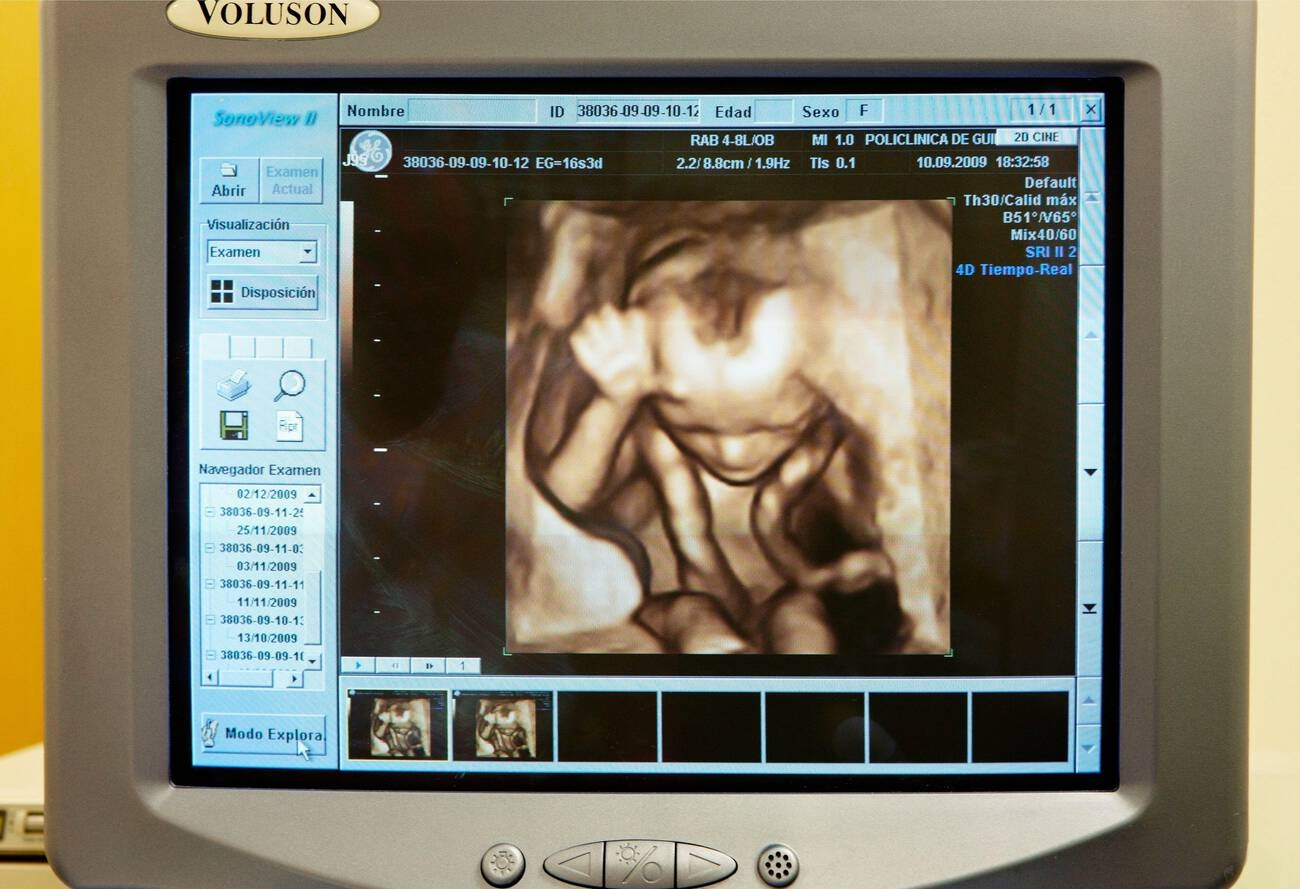
A clinical monitor displaying 3D and 4D obstetric ultrasound surface rendering, utilized for detailed anatomical visualization of a fetus during a mid-trimester scan.

Beyond routine tracking of fetal development, the real-time 3D and 4D ultrasound capabilities of the Voluson 730 facilitate the characterization of complex congenital defects. The technology is utilized in evaluating skeletal anomalies and assessing intricate fetal heart conditions. Utilizing dynamic real-time rendering, clinicians can monitor and examine the fetal heart rate and cardiac cycle in real-time, allowing for detailed, multi-planar fetal echocardiography.

== Versions ==
The Voluson 730 was produced by GE in Professional and Expert versions. The Expert added additional features not found on the Pro version, most notable an extra touchscreen LCD used for navigation.
