= Medical ultrasound =

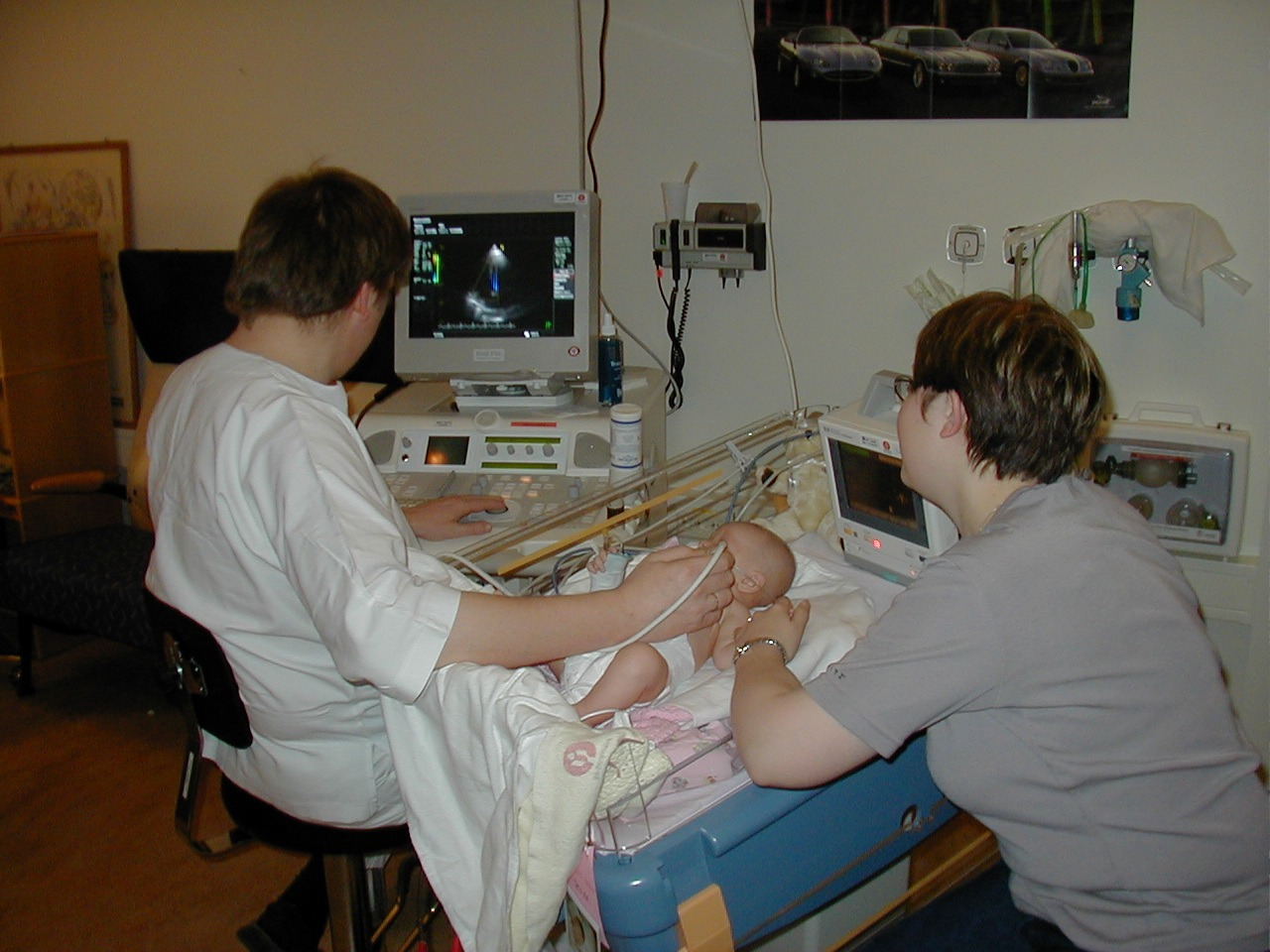
- Sonographer carrying out echocardiography on a child
- ICD-10-PCS: B?4
- ICD-9-CM: 88.7
- MeSH: D014463
- OPS-301 code: 3-03...3-05

Medical ultrasound includes diagnostic techniques (mainly imaging) using ultrasound, as well as therapeutic applications of ultrasound. In diagnosis, it is used to create an image of internal body structures such as tendons, muscles, joints, blood vessels, and internal organs, to measure some characteristics (e.g., distances and velocities) or to generate an informative audible sound. The usage of ultrasound to produce visual images for medicine is called medical ultrasonography or simply sonography. Sonography using ultrasound reflection is called echography. There are also transmission methods, such as ultrasound transmission tomography. The practice of examining pregnant women using ultrasound is called obstetric ultrasonography, and was an early development of clinical ultrasonography. The machine used is called an ultrasound machine, a sonograph or an echograph. The visual image formed using this technique is called an ultrasonogram, a sonogram or an echogram.

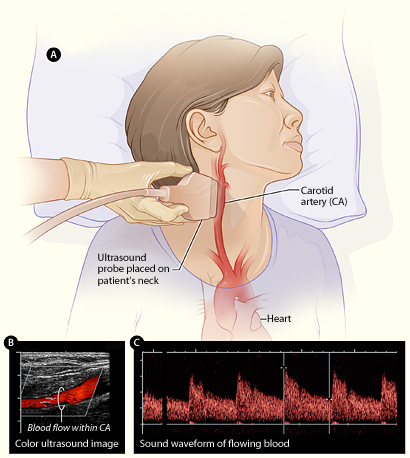
Ultrasound of carotid artery

Ultrasound is composed of sound waves with frequencies greater than 20,000 Hz, which is the approximate upper threshold of human hearing. Ultrasonic images, also known as sonograms, are created by sending pulses of ultrasound into tissue using a probe. The ultrasound pulses echo off tissues with different reflection properties and are returned to the probe which records and displays them as an image.

A general-purpose ultrasonic transducer may be used for most imaging purposes but some situations may require the use of a specialized transducer. Most ultrasound examination is done using a transducer on the surface of the body, but improved visualization is often possible if a transducer can be placed inside the body. For this purpose, special-use transducers, including transvaginal, endorectal, and transesophageal transducers are commonly employed. At the extreme, very small transducers can be mounted on small diameter catheters and placed within blood vessels to image the walls and disease of those vessels.

== Types ==
=== Mode ===
The imaging mode refers to probe and machine settings that result in specific dimensions of the ultrasound image. Several modes of ultrasound are used in medical imaging:

- A-mode: Amplitude mode refers to the mode in which the amplitude of the transducer voltage is recorded as a function of two-way travel time of an ultrasound pulse. A single pulse is transmitted through the body and scatters back to the same transducer element. The voltage amplitudes recorded correlate linearly to acoustic pressure amplitudes. A-mode is one-dimensional.
- B-mode: In brightness mode, an array of transducer elements scans a plane through the body resulting in a two-dimensional image. Each pixel value of the image correlates to voltage amplitude registered from the backscattered signal. The dimensions of B-mode images are voltage as a function of angle and two-way time.
- M-mode: In motion mode, A-mode pulses are emitted in succession. The backscattered signal is converted to lines of bright pixels, whose brightness linearly correlates to backscattered voltage amplitudes. Each next line is plotted adjacent to the previous, resulting in an image that looks like a B-mode image. The M-mode image dimensions are however voltage as a function of two-way time and recording time. This mode is an ultrasound analogy to streak video recording in high-speed photography. As moving tissue transitions produce backscattering, this can be used to determine the displacement of specific organ structures, most commonly the heart.

Most machines convert two-way time to imaging depth using an assumed speed of sound of 1540 m/s. As the actual speed of sound varies greatly in different tissue types, an ultrasound image is therefore not a true tomographic representation of the body.

=== 3D imaging ===
Three-dimensional imaging is done by combining B-mode images, using dedicated rotating or stationary probes. This has been referred to as C-mode.

A hybrid rotating ultrasound/photoacoustic system produces 3D images, including blood and tissue without the use of magnets or ionizing radiation. It uses an arc of detectors to create a volumetric image. A laser pulse causes hemoglobin molecules to vibrate and generate acoustic signal also absorbed by the detectors.

=== Technique ===
An imaging technique is a method of signal generation and processing used for a specific application. Most techniques use B-mode.

- Doppler sonography: This imaging technique uses the Doppler effect to detect and measure the movement of structures, typically blood.
- Harmonic imaging: backscattered signal from tissue is filtered to comprise only frequency content of at least twice the centre frequency of the transmitted ultrasound. Harmonic imaging is used for perfusion detection with ultrasound contrast agents and for detecting tissue harmonics. Common pulse schemes for the creation of harmonic response without the need of real-time Fourier analysis are pulse inversion and power modulation.

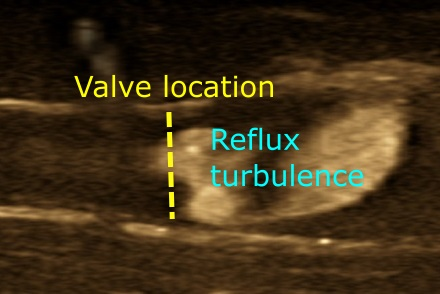
B-flow image of venous reflux.

- B-flow is an imaging technique that digitally highlights moving reflectors (mainly red blood cells) while suppressing the signals from the surrounding stationary tissue. It aims to visualize flowing blood and surrounding stationary tissues simultaneously. It is thus an alternative or complement to Doppler ultrasonography in visualizing blood flow.

Therapeutic ultrasound aimed at a specific tumor or calculus is not an imaging mode. However, for positioning a treatment probe to focus on a specific region of interest, A-mode and B-mode are typically used, often during treatment.

== Uses ==
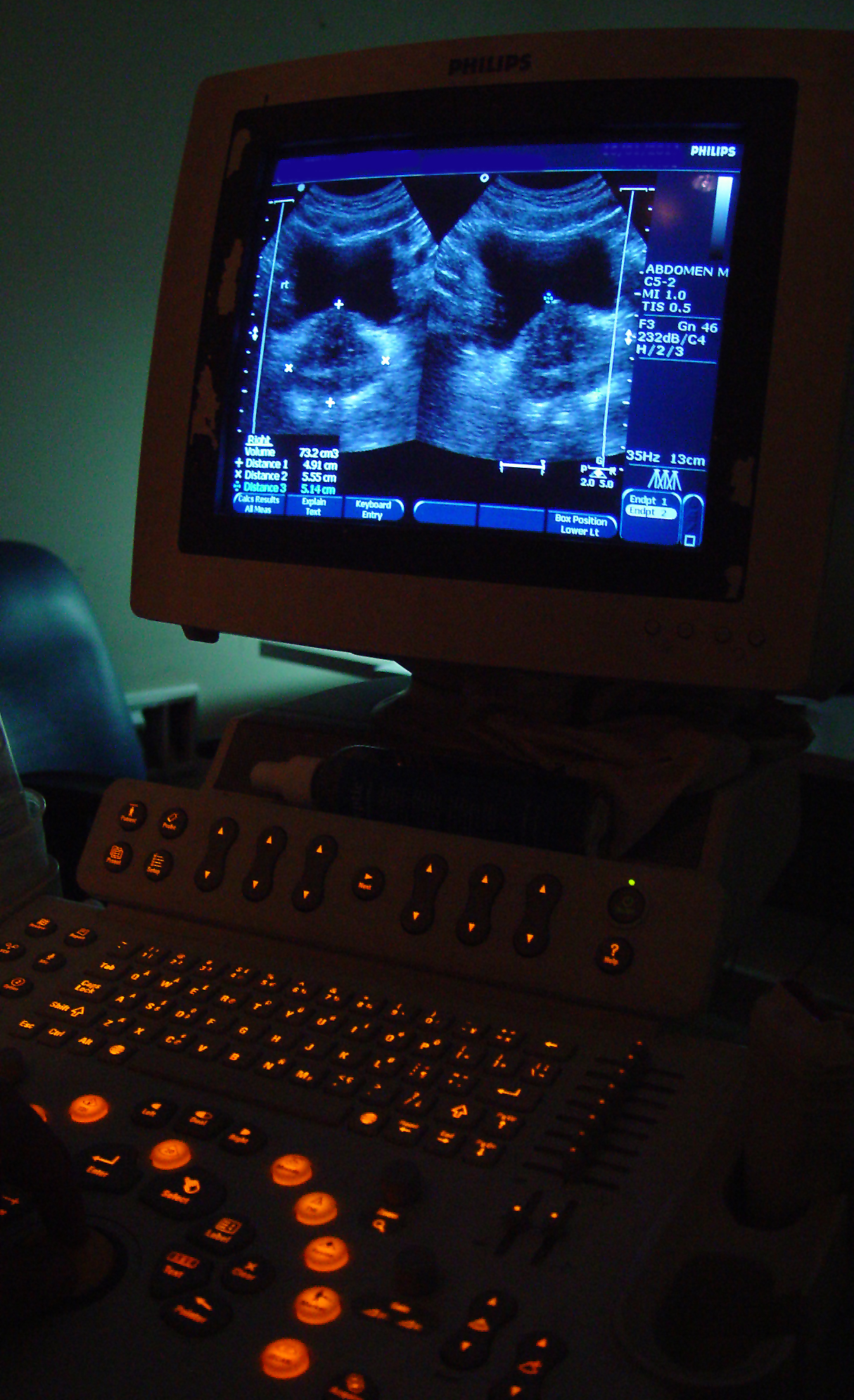
Urinary bladder (black butterfly-like shape) and hyperplastic prostate (BPH) visualized by medical ultrasound

Sonography (ultrasonography) is widely used in medicine. It is possible to perform both diagnosis and therapeutic procedures, using ultrasound to guide interventional procedures such as biopsies or to drain collections of fluid, which can be both diagnostic and therapeutic. Sonographers are medical professionals who perform scans which are traditionally interpreted by radiologists, physicians who specialize in the application and interpretation of medical imaging modalities, or by cardiologists in the case of cardiac ultrasonography (echocardiography). Sonography is effective for imaging soft tissues of the body. Superficial structures such as muscle, tendon, testis, breast, thyroid and parathyroid glands, and the neonatal brain are imaged at higher frequencies (7–18 MHz), which provide better linear (axial) and horizontal (lateral) resolution. Deeper structures such as liver and kidney are imaged at lower frequencies (1–6 MHz) with lower axial and lateral resolution as a price of deeper tissue penetration.

=== Anesthesiology ===
In anesthesiology, ultrasound is commonly used to guide the placement of needles when injecting local anesthetic solutions in the proximity of nerves identified within the ultrasound image (nerve block). It is also used for vascular access such as cannulation of large central veins and for difficult arterial cannulation. Transcranial Doppler is frequently used by neuro-anesthesiologists for obtaining information about flow-velocity in the basal cerebral vessels.

=== Angiology (vascular) ===
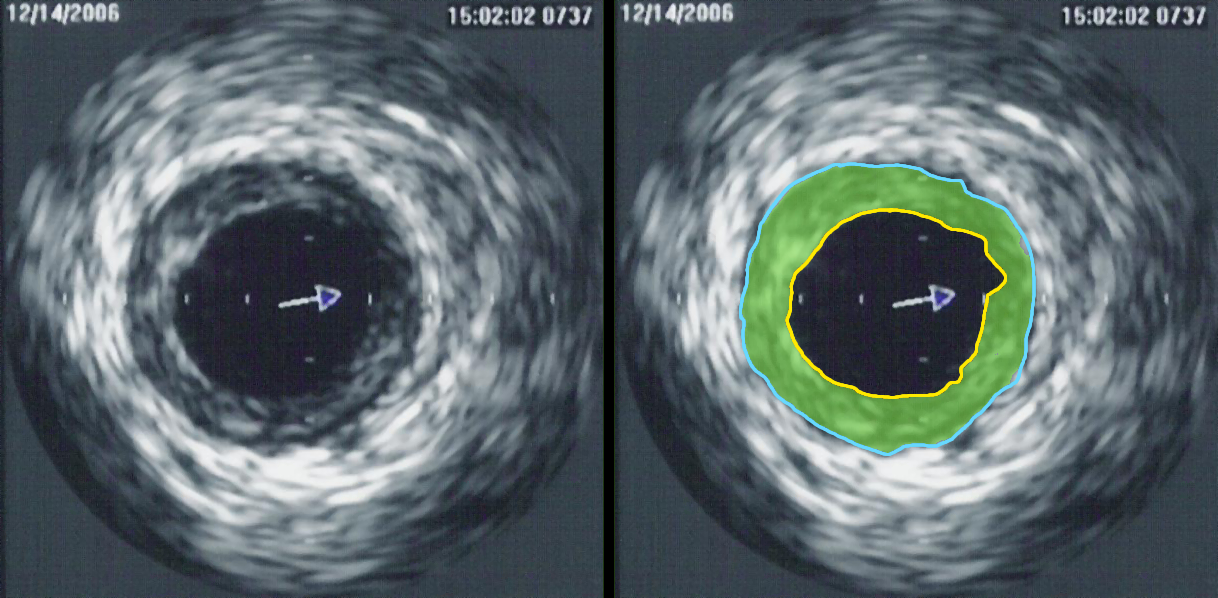
Intravascular ultrasound image of a coronary artery (left), with color-coding on the right, delineating the lumen (yellow), external elastic membrane (blue) and the atherosclerotic plaque burden (green)

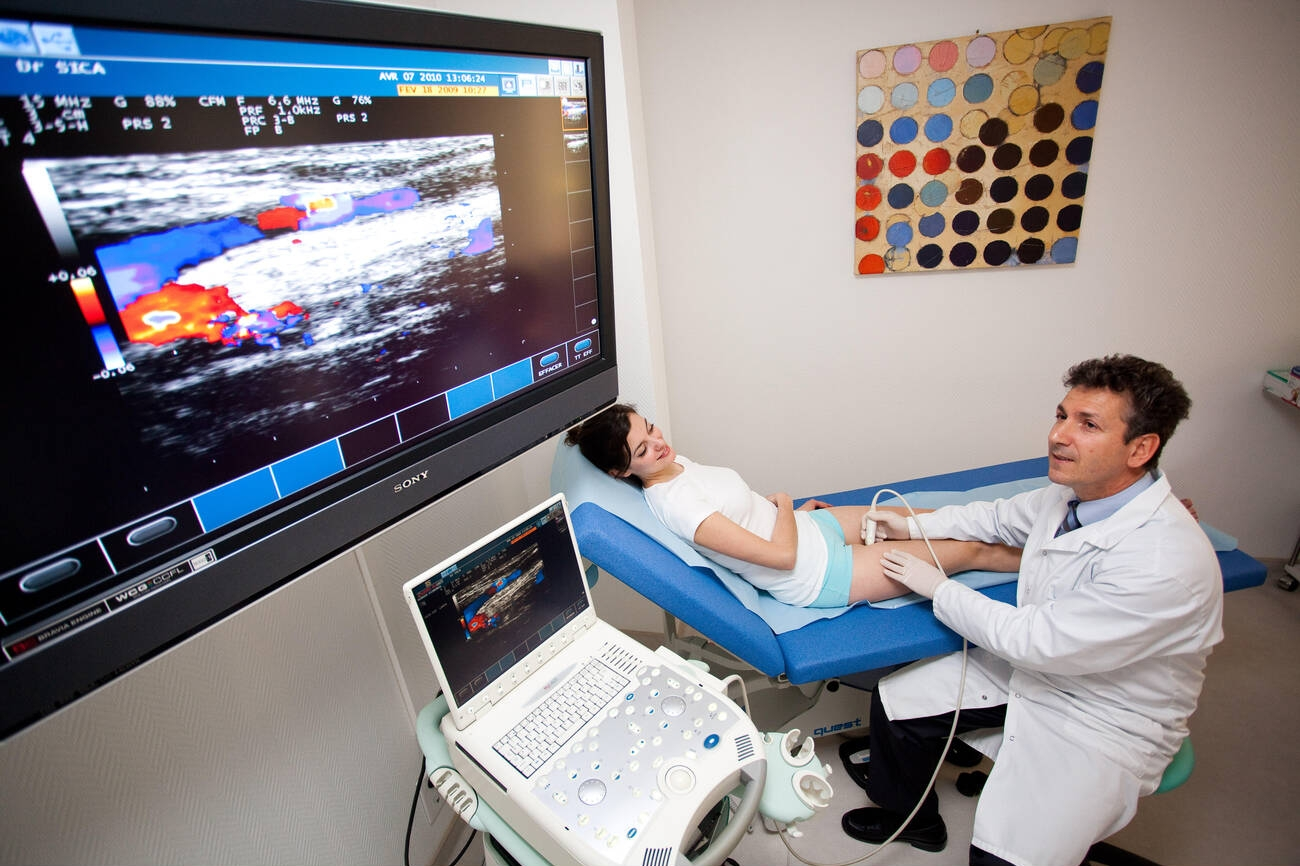
A vascular sonography examination using Doppler ultrasound to assess blood flow and evaluate circulatory conditions in an outpatient setting.

In angiology or vascular medicine, duplex ultrasound (B Mode imaging combined with Doppler flow measurement) is used to diagnose arterial and venous disease. This is particularly important in potential neurologic problems, where carotid ultrasound is commonly used for assessing blood flow and potential or suspected stenosis in the carotid arteries, while transcranial Doppler is used for imaging flow in the intracerebral arteries. Intravascular ultrasound (IVUS) uses a specially designed catheter with a miniaturized ultrasound probe attached to its distal end, which is then threaded inside a blood vessel. The proximal end of the catheter is attached to computerized ultrasound equipment and allows the application of ultrasound technology, such as a piezoelectric transducer or capacitive micromachined ultrasonic transducer, to visualize the endothelium of blood vessels in living individuals.

In the case of the common and potentially, serious problem of blood clots in the deep veins of the leg, ultrasound plays a key diagnostic role, while ultrasonography of chronic venous insufficiency of the legs focuses on more superficial veins to assist with planning of suitable interventions to relieve symptoms or improve cosmetics.

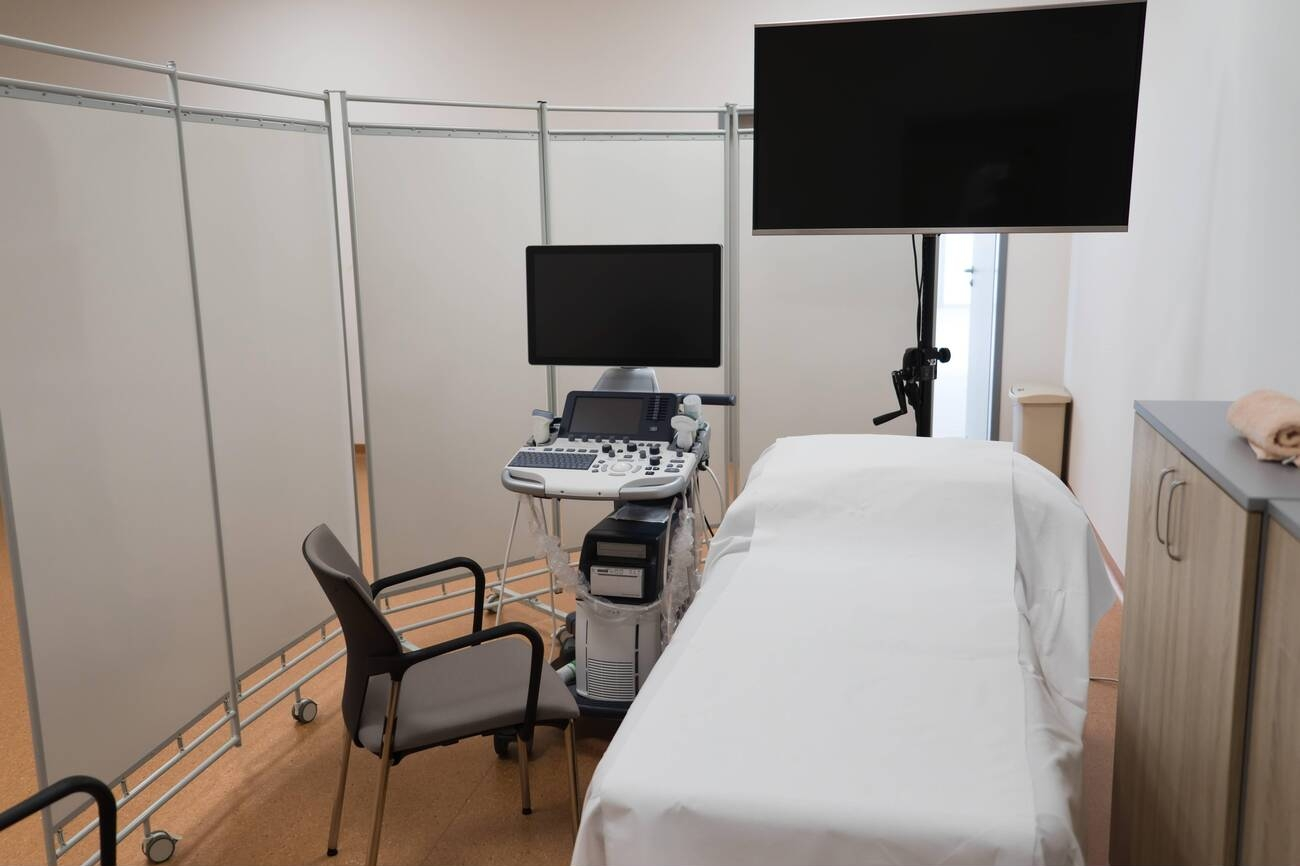
A clinical ultrasound examination room setup showing a mobile cart console, examination table, and wall-mounted display, configured in alignment with healthcare facility ergonomics and positioning guidelines.

=== Cardiology (heart) ===
Ultrasound of a human heart (apical 4-chamber view) showing the four chambers, mitral valve, and tricuspid valves.

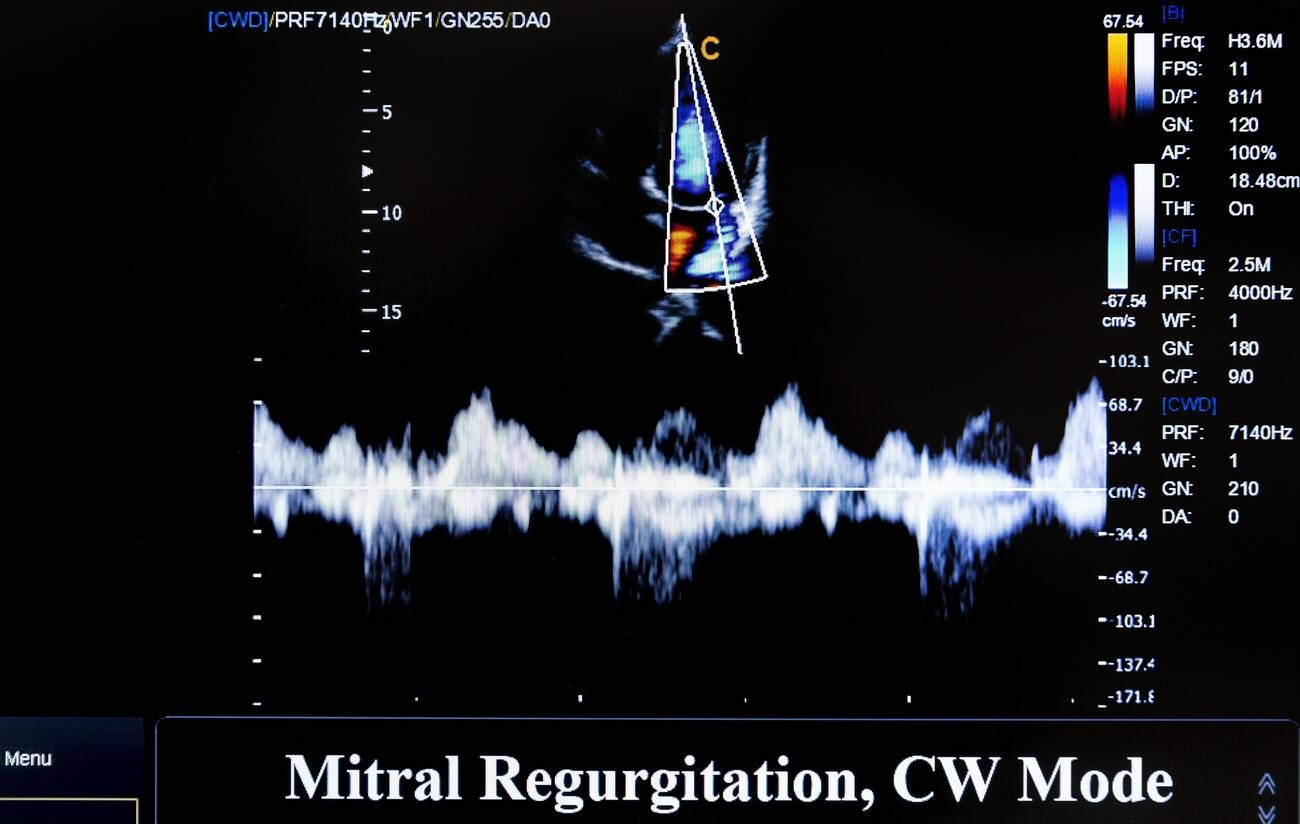
A 2D color Doppler echocardiogram in the parasternal long-axis (PLAX) view demonstrating a jet of mitral valve regurgitation (valvular insufficiency) into the left atrium.

Echocardiography is an essential tool in cardiology, assisting in evaluation of heart valve function, such as stenosis or insufficiency, strength of cardiac muscle contraction, and hypertrophy or dilatation of the main chambers. (ventricle and atrium)

=== Emergency medicine ===
Point of care ultrasound has many applications in emergency medicine. These include differentiating cardiac from pulmonary causes of acute breathlessness, and the Focused Assessment with Sonography for Trauma (FAST) exam, extended to include assessment for significant hemoperitoneum or pericardial tamponade after trauma (EFAST). Other uses include assisting with differentiating causes of abdominal pain such as gallstones and kidney stones. Emergency medicine residents receive training in point-of-care ultrasonography.

=== Gastroenterology/Colorectal surgery ===
Both abdominal and endoanal ultrasound are frequently used in gastroenterology and colorectal surgery. In abdominal sonography, the major organs of the abdomen such as the pancreas, aorta, inferior vena cava, liver, gall bladder, bile ducts, kidneys, and spleen may be imaged. However, sound waves may be blocked by gas in the bowel and attenuated to differing degrees by fat, sometimes limiting diagnostic capabilities. The appendix can sometimes be seen when inflamed (e.g.: appendicitis) and ultrasound is the initial imaging choice, avoiding radiation if possible, although it frequently needs to be followed by other imaging methods such as CT. Endoanal ultrasound is used particularly in the investigation of anorectal symptoms such as fecal incontinence or obstructed defecation. It images the immediate perianal anatomy and is able to detect occult defects such as tearing of the anal sphincter.

=== Hepatology ===
Ultrasonography of liver tumors allows for both detection and characterization. Ultrasound imaging studies are often obtained during the evaluation process of Fatty liver disease. Ultrasonography reveals a "bright" liver with increased echogenicity. Pocket-sized ultrasound devices might be used as point-of-care screening tools to diagnose liver steatosis.

=== Gynecology and obstetrics ===
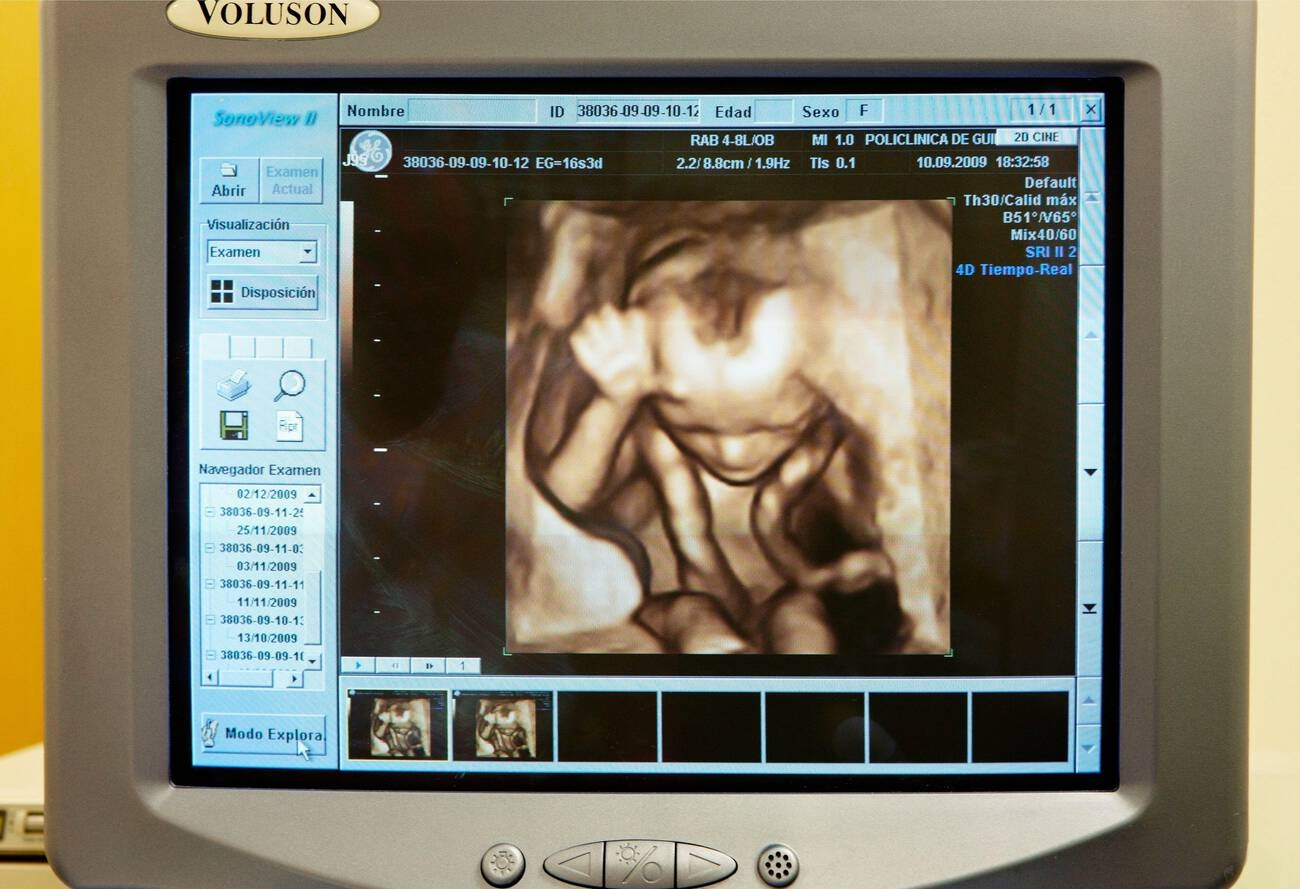
A clinical monitor displaying 3D and 4D obstetric ultrasound surface rendering, utilized for detailed anatomical visualization of a fetus during a mid-trimester scan.

Orthogonal planes of a three-dimensional sonographic volume with transverse and coronal measurements for estimating fetal cranial volume

Gynecologic ultrasonography examines female pelvic organs (specifically the uterus, ovaries, and fallopian tubes) as well as the bladder, adnexa, and pouch of Douglas. It uses transducers designed for approaches through the lower abdominal wall, curvilinear and sector, and specialty transducers such as transvaginal ultrasound.

Obstetrical sonography was originally developed in the late 1950s and 1960s by Ian Donald and is commonly used during pregnancy to check the development and presentation of the fetus. It can be used to identify many conditions that could be potentially harmful to the mother and/or baby possibly remaining undiagnosed or with delayed diagnosis in the absence of sonography. It is currently believed that the risk of delayed diagnosis is greater than the small risk, if any, associated with undergoing an ultrasound scan. However, its use for non-medical purposes such as fetal "keepsake" videos and photos is discouraged.

Obstetric ultrasound is primarily used to:

- Date the pregnancy (gestational age)
- Confirm fetal viability
- Determine the location of the fetus, intrauterine vs ectopic
- Check the location of the placenta in relation to the cervix
- Check for the number of fetuses (multiple pregnancy)
- Check for major physical abnormalities.
- Assess fetal growth (for evidence of intrauterine growth restriction (IUGR))
- Check for fetal movement and heartbeat.
- Determine the sex of the baby

According to the European Committee of Medical Ultrasound Safety (ECMUS)

Ultrasonic examinations should only be performed by competent personnel who are trained and updated in safety matters. Ultrasound produces heating, pressure changes and mechanical disturbances in tissue. Diagnostic levels of ultrasound can produce temperature rises that are hazardous to sensitive organs and the embryo/fetus. Biological effects of non-thermal origin have been reported in animals but, to date, no such effects have been demonstrated in humans, except when a micro-bubble contrast agent is present.

Nonetheless, care should be taken to use low power settings and avoid pulsed wave scanning of the fetal brain unless specifically indicated in high risk pregnancies.

Figures released for the period 2005–2006 by the UK Government (Department of Health) show that non-obstetric ultrasound examinations constituted more than 65% of the total number of ultrasound scans conducted.

=== Hemodynamics (blood circulation) ===
Blood velocity can be measured in various blood vessels, such as middle cerebral artery or descending aorta, by relatively inexpensive and low risk ultrasound Doppler probes attached to portable monitors. These provide non-invasive or transcutaneous (non-piercing) minimal invasive blood flow assessment. Common examples are transcranial Doppler, esophageal Doppler and suprasternal Doppler.

=== Otolaryngology (head and neck) ===
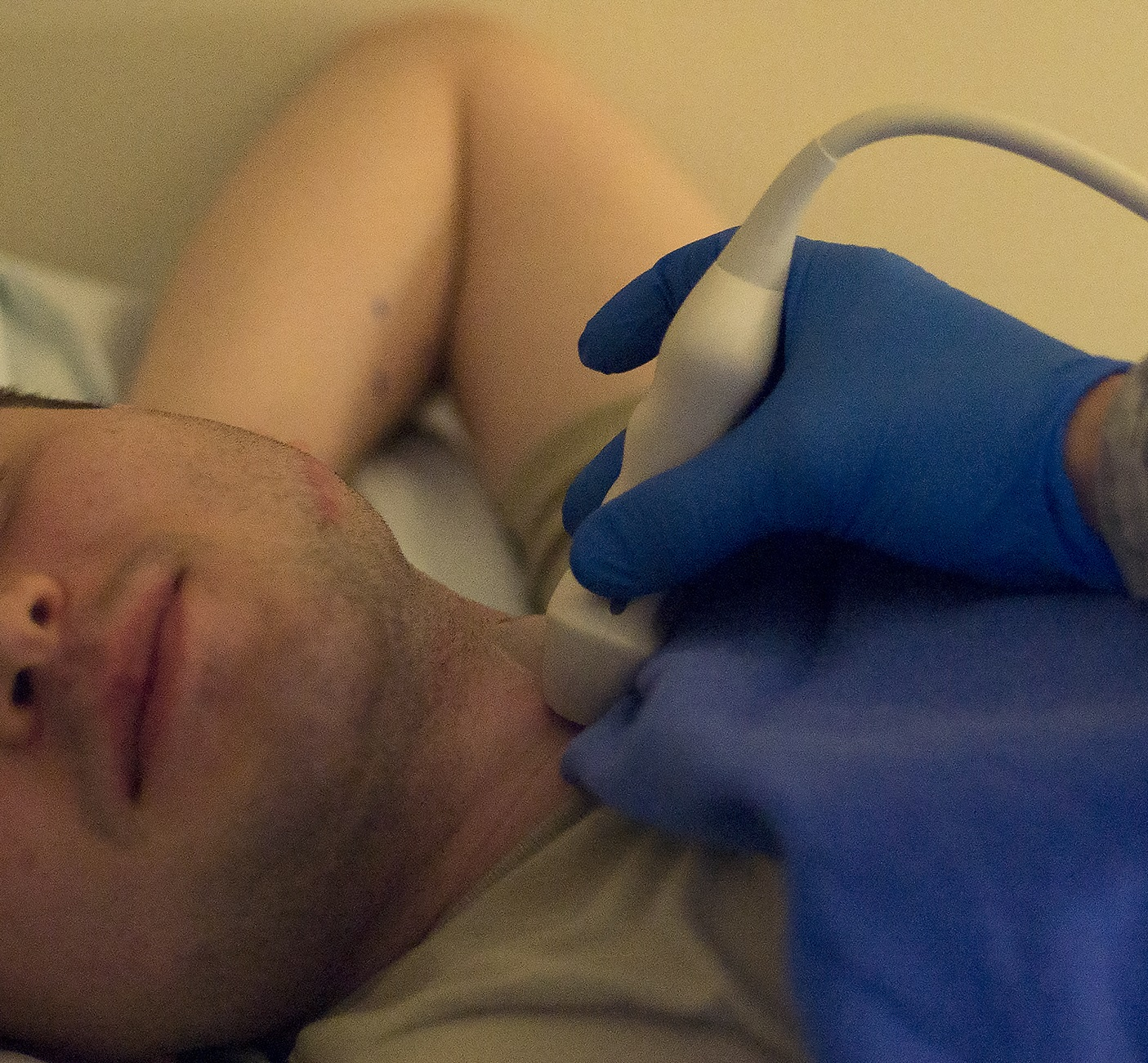
Neck ultrasound

Most structures of the neck, including the thyroid and parathyroid glands, lymph nodes, and salivary glands, are well-visualized by high-frequency ultrasound with exceptional anatomic detail. Ultrasound is the preferred imaging modality for thyroid tumors and lesions, and its use is important in the evaluation, preoperative planning, and postoperative surveillance of patients with thyroid cancer. Many other benign and malignant conditions in the head and neck can be differentiated, evaluated, and managed with the help of diagnostic ultrasound and ultrasound-guided procedures.

=== Neonatology ===
In neonatology, transcranial Doppler can be used for basic assessment of intracerebral structural abnormalities, suspected hemorrhage, ventriculomegaly or hydrocephalus and anoxic insults (periventricular leukomalacia). It can be performed through the soft spots in the skull of a newborn infant (fontanelle) until these completely close at about 1 year of age by which time they have formed a virtually impenetrable acoustic barrier to ultrasound. The most common site for cranial ultrasound is the anterior fontanelle. The smaller the fontanelle, the more the image is compromised.

Lung ultrasound has been found to be useful in diagnosing common neonatal respiratory diseases such as transient tachypnea of the newborn, respiratory distress syndrome, congenital pneumonia, meconium aspiration syndrome, and pneumothorax. A neonatal lung ultrasound score, first described by Brat et al., has been found to highly correlate with oxygenation in the newborn.

=== Ophthalmology (eyes) ===
In ophthalmology and optometry, there are two major forms of eye exam using ultrasound:

- A-scan ultrasound biometry, is commonly referred to as an A-scan (amplitude scan). A-mode provides data on the length of the eye, which is a major determinant in common sight disorders, especially for determining the power of an intraocular lens after cataract extraction.
- B-scan ultrasonography, or B-scan (brightness scan), is a B-mode scan that produces a cross-sectional view of the eye and the orbit. It is an essential tool in ophthalmology for diagnosing and managing a wide array of conditions affecting the posterior segment of the eye. It is non-invasive and uses a frequency of 10–15 MHz. It is often used in conjunction with other imaging techniques (like OCT or fluorescein angiography) for a more comprehensive evaluation of ocular conditions.

=== Pulmonology (lungs) ===
Ultrasound is used to assess the lungs in a variety of settings including critical care, emergency medicine, trauma surgery, as well as general medicine and nursing. This imaging modality is used at the bedside or examination table to evaluate a number of different lung abnormalities and to guide respiratory therapy and mechanical ventilation, and procedures such as thoracentesis, (drainage of pleural fluid (effusion)), needle aspiration biopsy, and catheter placement. Although air present in the lungs does not allow good penetration of ultrasound waves, interpretation of specific artifacts created on the lung surface can be used to detect abnormalities.

Lung, or pulmonary ultrasound does not visualise the lung itself, but the tissue-air-interface at the pleural line. The fact that artefact interpretation is essential sets lung ultrasound apart from modalities aimed at imaging an actual organ. This distinction has mechanical implications that are important when trying to interpret artifactual patterns. Where modern sonography is aided by software filters and acoustic harmonics to enhance visualisation of organs such as the heart or liver, they corrupt the specific patterns sought in lung ultrasound. Therefore, a software preset void of imaging filters, harmonic imaging, and beam compounding, is preferred.

==== Lung ultrasound basics ====
- The Normal Lung Surface: The lung surface is composed of visceral and parietal pleura. These two surfaces are typically pushed together and make up the pleural line, which is the basis of lung (or pleural) ultrasound. This line is visible less than a centimeter below the rib line in most adults. On ultrasound, it is visualized as a hyperechoic (bright white) horizontal line if the ultrasound probe is applied perpendicularly to the skin.
- Artifacts: Lung ultrasound relies on artifacts, which would otherwise be considered a hindrance in imaging. Air blocks the ultrasound beam and thus visualizing healthy lung tissue itself with this mode of imaging is not practical. Consequently, physicians and sonographers have learned to recognize patterns that ultrasound beams create when imaging healthy versus diseased lung tissue. Three commonly seen and utilized artifacts in lung ultrasound include lung sliding, A-lines, and B-lines.
  - § Lung Sliding: The presence of lung sliding, which indicates the shimmering of the pleural line that occurs with movement of the visceral and parietal pleura against one another with respiration (sometimes described as 'ants marching'), is the most important finding in normal aerated lung. Lung sliding indicates both that the lung is present at the chest wall and that the lung is functioning.
  - § A-lines: When the ultrasound beam makes contact with the pleural line, it is reflected back creating a bright white horizontal line. The subsequent reverberation artifacts that appear as equally spaced horizontal lines deep to the pleura are A-lines. Ultimately, A-lines are a reflection of the ultrasound beam from the pleura with the space between A-lines corresponding to the distance between the parietal pleura and the skin surface. A-lines indicate the presence of air, which means that these artifacts can be present in normal healthy lung (and also in patients with pneumothorax).
  - § B-lines: B-lines are also reverberation artifacts. They are visualized as hyperechoic vertical lines extending from the pleura to the edge of the ultrasound screen. These lines are sharply defined and laser-like and typically do not fade as they progress down the screen. A few B-lines that move along with the sliding pleura can be seen in normal lung due to acoustic impedance differences between water and air. However, excessive B-lines (three or more) are abnormal and are typically indicative of underlying lung pathology.

==== Lung pathology assessed with ultrasound ====
- Pulmonary edema: Lung ultrasound has been shown to be very sensitive for the detection of pulmonary edema. It allows for improvement in diagnosis and management of critically ill patients, particularly when used in combination with echocardiography. The sonographic feature that is present in pulmonary edema is multiple B-lines. B-lines can occur in a healthy lung; however, the presence of 3 or more in the anterior or lateral lung regions is always abnormal. In pulmonary edema, B-lines indicate an increase in the amount of water contained in the lungs outside of the pulmonary vasculature. B-lines can also be present in a number of other conditions including pneumonia, pulmonary contusion, and lung infarction. Additionally, there are multiple types of interactions between the pleural surface and the ultrasound wave that can generate artifacts with some similarity to B-lines but which do not have pathologic significance.
- Atelectasis: Consolidations are, as opposed to artifactual patterns, directly visualised on lung ultrasound. Differentiation of consolidations within the lung can be made with qualitative methods such as the presence of dynamic, or static air bronchograms, being air trapped within smaller airways inside of consolidations. Pathognomic changes in resorptive and compressive atelectasis, respectively can thus be distinguished.
- Pneumothorax: In clinical settings when pneumothorax is suspected, lung ultrasound can aid in diagnosis. In pneumothorax, air is present between the two layers of the pleura and lung sliding on ultrasound is therefore absent. The negative predictive value for lung sliding on ultrasound is reported as 99.2–100% – briefly, if lung sliding is present, a pneumothorax is effectively ruled out. The absence of lung sliding, however, is not necessarily specific for pneumothorax as there are other conditions that also cause this finding including acute respiratory distress syndrome, lung consolidations, pleural adhesions, and pulmonary fibrosis.
- Pleural effusion: Lung ultrasound is a cost-effective, safe, and non-invasive imaging method that can aid in the prompt visualization and diagnosis of pleural effusions. Effusions can be diagnosed by a combination of physical exam, percussion, and auscultation of the chest. However, these exam techniques can be complicated by a variety of factors including the presence of mechanical ventilation, obesity, or patient positioning, all of which reduce the sensitivity of the physical exam. Consequently, lung ultrasound can be an additional tool to augment plain chest Xray and chest CT. Pleural effusions on ultrasound appear as structural images within the thorax rather than an artifact. They will typically have four distinct borders including the pleural line, two rib shadows, and a deep border. In critically ill patients with pleural effusion, ultrasound may guide procedures including needle insertion, thoracentesis, and chest-tube insertion.
- Lung cancer staging: In pulmonology, endobronchial ultrasound (EBUS) probes are applied to standard flexible endoscopic probes and used by pulmonologists to allow for direct visualization of endobronchial lesions and lymph nodes prior to transbronchial needle aspiration. Among its many uses, EBUS aids in lung cancer staging by allowing for lymph node sampling without the need for major surgery.
- COVID-19: Lung ultrasound has proved useful in the diagnosis of COVID-19 especially in cases where other investigations are not available.

=== Urinary tract ===
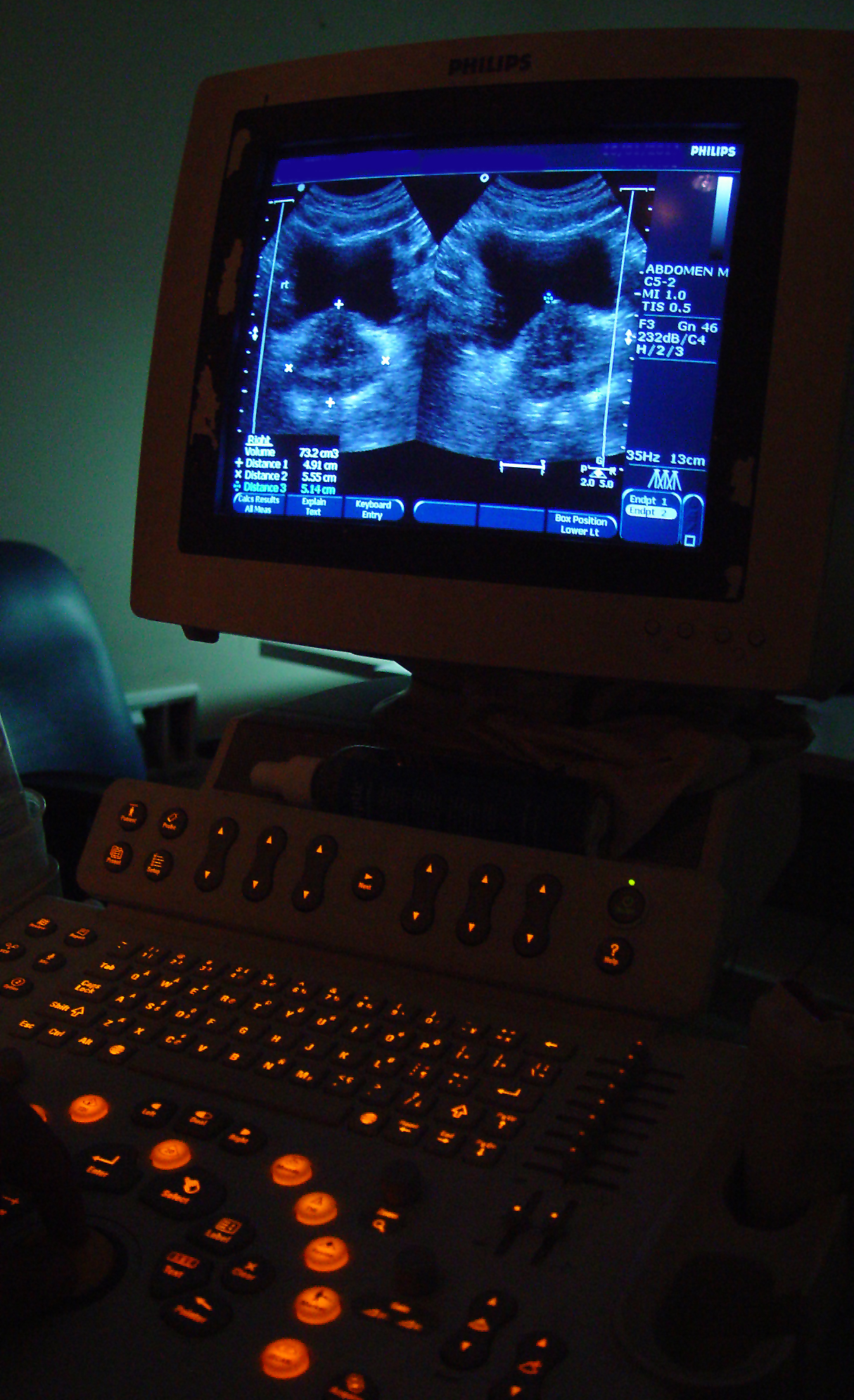
Urinary bladder (black butterfly-like shape) and hyperplastic prostate (BPH) visualized by medical sonographic technique

Ultrasound is routinely used in urology to determine the amount of fluid retained in a patient's bladder. In a pelvic sonogram, images include the uterus and ovaries or urinary bladder in females. In males, a sonogram will provide information about the bladder, prostate, or testicles (for example to urgently distinguish epididymitis from testicular torsion). In young males, it is used to distinguish more benign testicular masses (varicocele or hydrocele) from testicular cancer, which is curable but must be treated to preserve health and fertility. There are two methods of performing pelvic sonography – externally or internally. The internal pelvic sonogram is performed either transvaginally (in a woman) or transrectally (in a man). Sonographic imaging of the pelvic floor can produce important diagnostic information regarding the precise relationship of abnormal structures with other pelvic organs and it represents a useful hint to treat patients with symptoms related to pelvic prolapse, double incontinence and obstructed defecation. It is also used to diagnose and, at higher frequencies, to treat (break up) kidney stones or kidney crystals (nephrolithiasis).

=== Penis and scrotum ===
Scrotal ultrasonography is used in the evaluation of testicular pain, and can help identify solid masses.

Ultrasound is an excellent method for the study of the penis, such as indicated in trauma, priapism, erectile dysfunction or suspected Peyronie's disease.

=== Musculoskeletal ===
Musculoskeletal ultrasound is used to examine tendons, muscles, nerves, ligaments, soft tissue masses, and bone surfaces. It is helpful in diagnosing ligament sprains, muscle strains and joint pathology. It is an alternative or supplement to x-ray imaging in detecting fractures of the wrist, elbow and shoulder for patients up to 12 years (Fracture sonography).

Quantitative ultrasound is an adjunct musculoskeletal test for myopathic disease in children; estimates of lean body mass in adults; proxy measures of muscle quality (i.e., tissue composition) in older adults with sarcopenia

Ultrasound can also be used for needle guidance in muscle or joint injections, as in ultrasound-guided hip joint injection.

=== Kidneys ===
In nephrology, ultrasonography of the kidneys is essential in the diagnosis and management of kidney-related diseases. The kidneys are easily examined, and most pathological changes are distinguishable with ultrasound. It is an accessible, versatile, relatively economic, and fast aid for decision-making in patients with renal symptoms and for guidance in renal intervention. Using B-mode imaging, assessment of renal anatomy is easily performed, and US is often used as image guidance for renal interventions. Furthermore, novel applications in renal US have been introduced with contrast-enhanced ultrasound (CEUS), elastography and fusion imaging. However, renal US has certain limitations, and other modalities, such as CT (CECT) and MRI, should be considered for supplementary imaging in assessing renal disease.

=== Venous access ===
Intravenous access, for the collection of blood samples to assist in diagnosis or laboratory investigation including blood culture, or for administration of intravenous fluids for fluid maintenance of replacement or blood transfusion in sicker patients, is a common medical procedure. The need for intravenous access occurs in the outpatient laboratory, in the inpatient hospital units, and most critically in the Emergency Room and Intensive Care Unit. In many situations, intravenous access may be required repeatedly or over a significant time period. In these latter circumstances, a needle with an overlying catheter is introduced into the vein and the catheter is then inserted securely into the vein while the needle is withdrawn. The chosen veins are most frequently selected from the arm, but in challenging situations, a deeper vein from the neck (external jugular vein) or upper arm (subclavian vein) may need to be used. There are many reasons why the selection of a suitable vein may be problematic. These include, but are not limited to, obesity, previous injury to veins from inflammatory reaction to previous 'blood draws', previous injury to veins from recreational drug use.

In these challenging situations, the insertion of a catheter into a vein has been greatly assisted by the use of ultrasound. The ultrasound unit may be 'cart-based' or 'handheld' using a linear transducer with a frequency of 10 to 15 megahertz. In most circumstances, choice of vein will be limited by the requirement that the vein is within 1.5 cms. from the skin surface. The transducer may be placed longitudinally or transversely over the chosen vein. Ultrasound training for intravenous cannulation is offered in most ultrasound training programs.

== Mechanism ==
The creation of an image from sound has three steps – transmitting a sound wave, receiving echoes, and interpreting those echoes.

=== Producing a sound wave ===
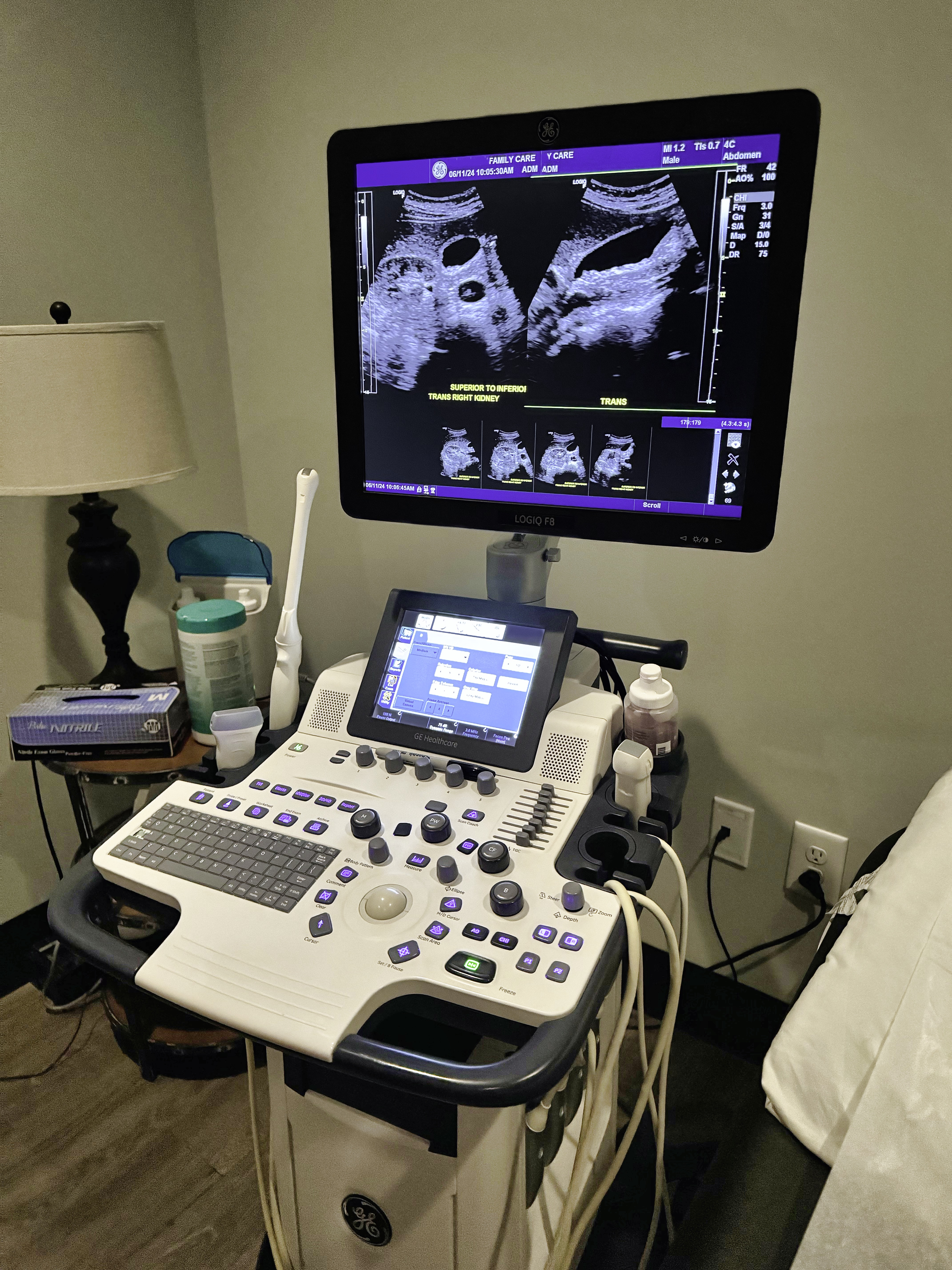
A modern medical ultrasound scanner

A sound wave is typically produced by a piezoelectric transducer encased in a plastic housing. Strong, short electrical pulses from the ultrasound machine drive the transducer at the desired frequency. The frequencies can vary between 1 and 18 MHz, though frequencies up to 50–100 megahertz have been used experimentally in a technique known as biomicroscopy in special regions, such as the anterior chamber of the eye.

Older technology transducers focused their beam with physical lenses. Contemporary technology transducers use digital antenna array techniques (piezoelectric elements in the transducer produce echoes at different times) to enable the ultrasound machine to change the direction and depth of focus. Near the transducer, the width of the ultrasound beam almost equals to the width of the transducer, after reaching a distance from the transducer (near zone length or Fresnel zone), the beam width narrows to half of the transducer width, and after that the width increases (far zone length or Fraunhofer's zone), where the lateral resolution decreases. Therefore, the wider the transducer width and the higher the frequency of ultrasound, the longer the Fresnel zone, and the lateral resolution can be maintained at a greater depth from the transducer. Ultrasound waves travel in pulses. Therefore, a shorter pulse length requires higher bandwidth (greater number of frequencies) to constitute the ultrasound pulse.

As stated, the sound is focused either by the shape of the transducer, a lens in front of the transducer, or a complex set of control pulses from the ultrasound scanner, in the beamforming or spatial filtering technique. This focusing produces an arc-shaped sound wave from the face of the transducer. The wave travels into the body and comes into focus at a desired depth.

Materials on the face of the transducer enable the sound to be transmitted efficiently into the body (often a rubbery coating, a form of impedance matching). In addition, a water-based gel is placed between the patient's skin and the probe to facilitate ultrasound transmission into the body. This is because air causes total reflection of ultrasound; impeding the transmission of ultrasound into the body.

The sound wave is partially reflected from the layers between different tissues or scattered from smaller structures. Specifically, sound is reflected anywhere where there are acoustic impedance changes in the body: e.g. blood cells in blood plasma, small structures in organs, etc. Some of the reflections return to the transducer.

=== Receiving the echoes ===
The return of the sound wave to the transducer results in the same process as sending the sound wave, in reverse. The returned sound wave vibrates the transducer and the transducer turns the vibrations into electrical pulses that travel to the ultrasonic scanner where they are processed and transformed into a digital image.

=== Forming the image ===
To make an image, the ultrasound scanner must determine two characteristics from each received echo:

1. How long it took the echo to be received from when the sound was transmitted. (Time and distance are equivalent.)
2. How strong the echo was.

Once the ultrasonic scanner determines these two, it can locate which pixel in the image to illuminate and with what intensity.

Transforming the received signal into a digital image may be explained by using a blank spreadsheet as an analogy. First picture a long, flat transducer at the top of the sheet. Send pulses down the 'columns' of the spreadsheet (A, B, C, etc.). Listen at each column for any return echoes. When an echo is heard, note how long it took for the echo to return. The longer the wait, the deeper the row (1,2,3, etc.). The strength of the echo determines the brightness setting for that cell (white for a strong echo, black for a weak echo, and varying shades of grey for everything in between.) When all the echoes are recorded on the sheet, a greyscale image has been accomplished.

In modern ultrasound systems, images are derived from the combined reception of echoes by multiple elements, rather than a single one. These elements in the transducer array work together to receive signals, a process essential for optimizing the ultrasonic beam's focus and producing detailed images. One predominant method for this is "delay-and-sum" beamforming. The time delay applied to each element is calculated based on the geometrical relationship between the imaging point, the transducer, and receiver positions. By integrating these time-adjusted signals, the system pinpoints focus onto specific tissue regions, enhancing image resolution and clarity. The utilization of multiple element reception combined with the delay-and-sum principles underpins the high-quality images characteristic of contemporary ultrasound scans.

=== Displaying the image ===
Images from the ultrasound scanner are transferred and displayed using the DICOM standard. Normally, very little post processing is applied.

== Sound in the body ==
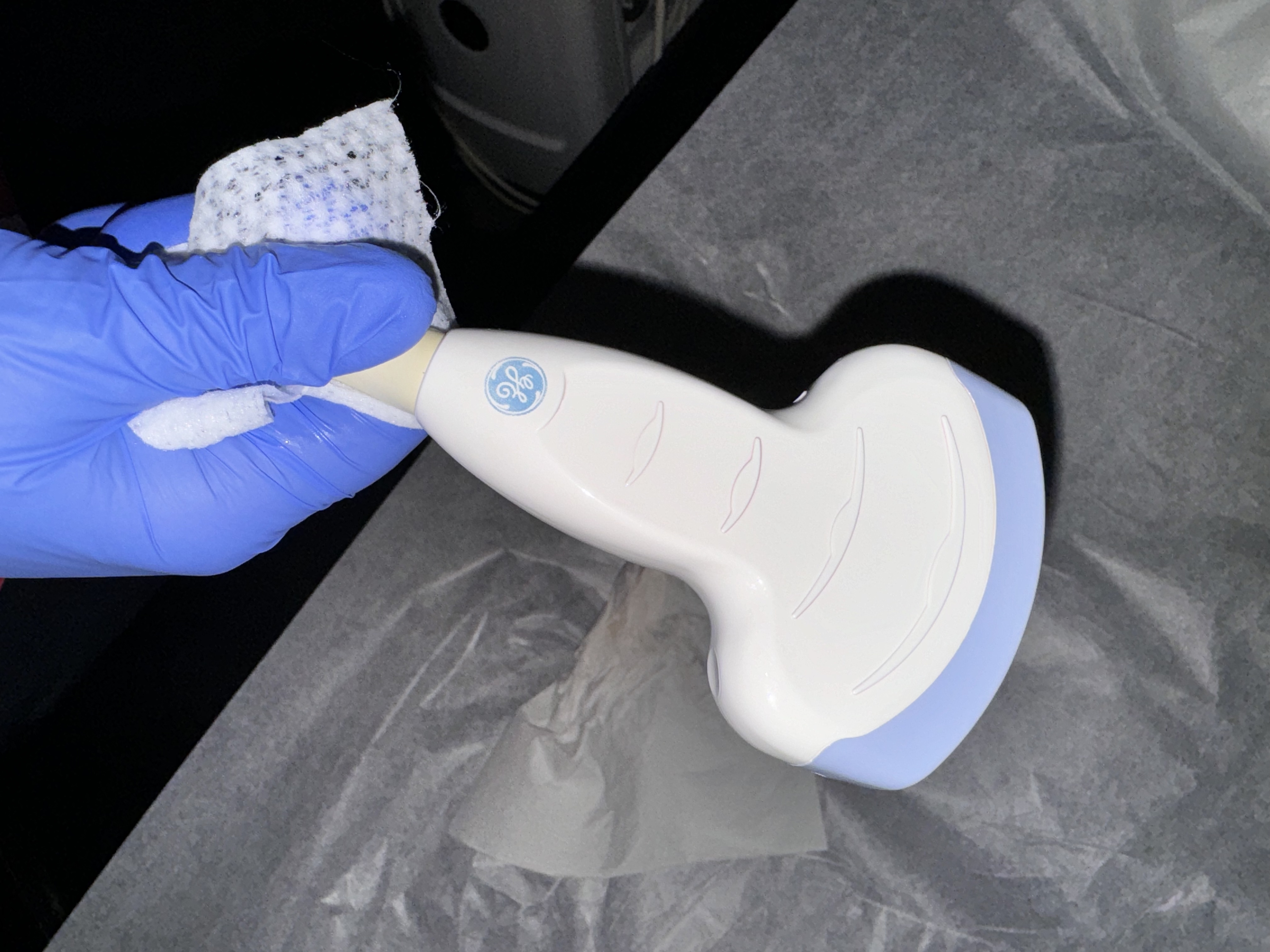
Curvilinear array transducer

Ultrasonography (sonography) uses a probe containing multiple acoustic transducers to send pulses of sound into a material. Whenever a sound wave encounters a material with a different density (acoustical impedance), some of the sound wave is scattered but part is reflected back to the probe and is detected as an echo. The time it takes for the echo to travel back to the probe is measured and used to calculate the depth of the tissue interface causing the echo. The greater the difference between acoustic impedances, the larger the echo is. If the pulse hits gases or solids, the density difference is so great that most of the acoustic energy is reflected and it becomes impossible to progress further.

The frequencies used for medical imaging are generally in the range of 1 to 18 MHz. Higher frequencies have a correspondingly smaller wavelength, and can be used to make more detailed sonograms. However, the attenuation of the sound wave is increased at higher frequencies, so penetration of deeper tissues necessitates a lower frequency (3–5 MHz).

Penetrating deep into the body with sonography is difficult. Some acoustic energy is lost each time an echo is formed, but most of it (approximately $\textstyle 0.5 \frac{\mbox{dB}}{\mbox{cm depth}\cdot\mbox{MHz}}$) is lost from acoustic absorption. (See Acoustic attenuation for further details on modeling of acoustic attenuation and absorption.)

The speed of sound varies as it travels through different materials, and is dependent on the acoustical impedance of the material. However, the sonographic instrument assumes that the acoustic velocity is constant at 1540 m/s. An effect of this assumption is that in a real body with non-uniform tissues, the beam becomes somewhat de-focused and image resolution is reduced.

To generate a 2D image, the ultrasonic beam is swept. A transducer may be swept mechanically by rotating or swinging or a 1D phased array transducer may be used to sweep the beam electronically. The received data is processed and used to construct the image. The image is then a 2D representation of the slice into the body.

3D images can be generated by acquiring a series of adjacent 2D images. Commonly a specialized probe that mechanically scans a conventional 2D image transducer is used. However, since the mechanical scanning is slow, it is difficult to make 3D images of moving tissues. 2D phased array transducers that can sweep the beam in 3D have been developed. These can image faster and can even be used to make live 3D images of a beating heart.

Doppler ultrasonography is used to study blood flow and muscle motion. The different detected speeds are represented in color for ease of interpretation, for example leaky heart valves: the leak shows up as a flash of unique color. Colors may alternatively be used to represent the amplitudes of the received echoes.

== Expansions ==
An additional expansion of ultrasound is bi-planar ultrasound, in which the probe has two 2D planes perpendicular to each other, providing more efficient localization and detection. Furthermore, an omniplane probe can rotate 180° to obtain multiple images. In 3D ultrasound, many 2D planes are digitally added together to create a three-dimensional image of the object.

=== Doppler ultrasonography ===
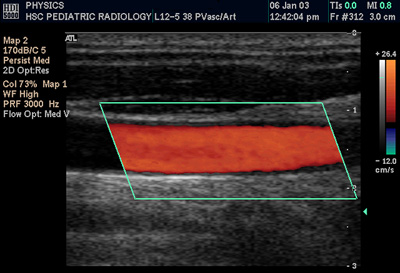
Duplex scan of the common carotid artery

Doppler ultrasonography employs the Doppler effect to assess whether structures (usually blood) are moving towards or away from the probe, and their relative velocity. By calculating the frequency shift of a particular sample volume, flow in an artery or a jet of blood flow over a heart valve, its speed and direction can be determined and visualized, as an example. Color Doppler is the measurement of velocity by color scale. Color Doppler images are generally combined with gray scale (B-mode) images to display duplex ultrasonography images. Uses include:

- Doppler echocardiography is the use of Doppler ultrasonography to examine the heart. An echocardiogram can, within certain limits, produce accurate assessment of the direction of blood flow and the velocity of blood and cardiac tissue at any arbitrary point using the Doppler effect. Velocity measurements allow assessment of cardiac valve areas and function, abnormal communications between the left and right side of the heart, leaking of blood through the valves (valvular regurgitation), and calculation of the cardiac output and E/A ratio (a measure of diastolic dysfunction). Contrast-enhanced ultrasound using gas-filled microbubble contrast media can be used to improve velocity or other flow-related measurements of interest.
- Transcranial Doppler (TCD) and transcranial color Doppler (TCCD), measure the velocity of blood flow through the brain's blood vessels through the cranium. They are useful in the diagnosis of emboli, stenosis, vasospasm from a subarachnoid hemorrhage (bleeding from a ruptured aneurysm), and other problems.
- Doppler fetal monitors use the Doppler effect to detect the fetal heartbeat during prenatal care. These are hand-held, and some models also display the heart rate in beats per minute (BPM). Use of this monitor is sometimes known as Doppler auscultation. The Doppler fetal monitor is commonly referred to simply as a Doppler or fetal Doppler and provides information similar to that provided by a fetal stethoscope.

=== Contrast ultrasonography (ultrasound contrast imaging) ===
A contrast medium for medical ultrasonography is a formulation of encapsulated gaseous microbubbles to increase echogenicity of blood, discovered by Dr. Raymond Gramiak in 1968 and named contrast-enhanced ultrasound. This contrast medical imaging modality is used throughout the world, for echocardiography in particular in the United States and for ultrasound radiology in Europe and Asia.

Microbubble-based contrast agents are administered intravenously into the patient's blood stream during ultrasonography. Due to their size, the microbubbles remain confined in blood vessels without extravasating towards the interstitial fluid. An ultrasound contrast media is therefore purely intravascular, making it an ideal agent to image organ microvasculature for diagnostic purposes. A typical clinical use of contrast ultrasonography is detection of a hypervascular metastatic tumor, which exhibits a contrast uptake (kinetics of microbubbles concentration in blood circulation) faster than healthy biological tissue surrounding the tumor. Other clinical applications using contrast exist, as in echocardiography to improve delineation of left ventricle for visualizing contractibility of heart muscle after a myocardial infarction. Finally, applications in quantitative perfusion (relative measurement of blood flow) have emerged for identifying early patient response to anti-cancerous drug treatment (methodology and clinical study by Dr. Nathalie Lassau in 2011), enabling the best oncological therapeutic options to be determined.

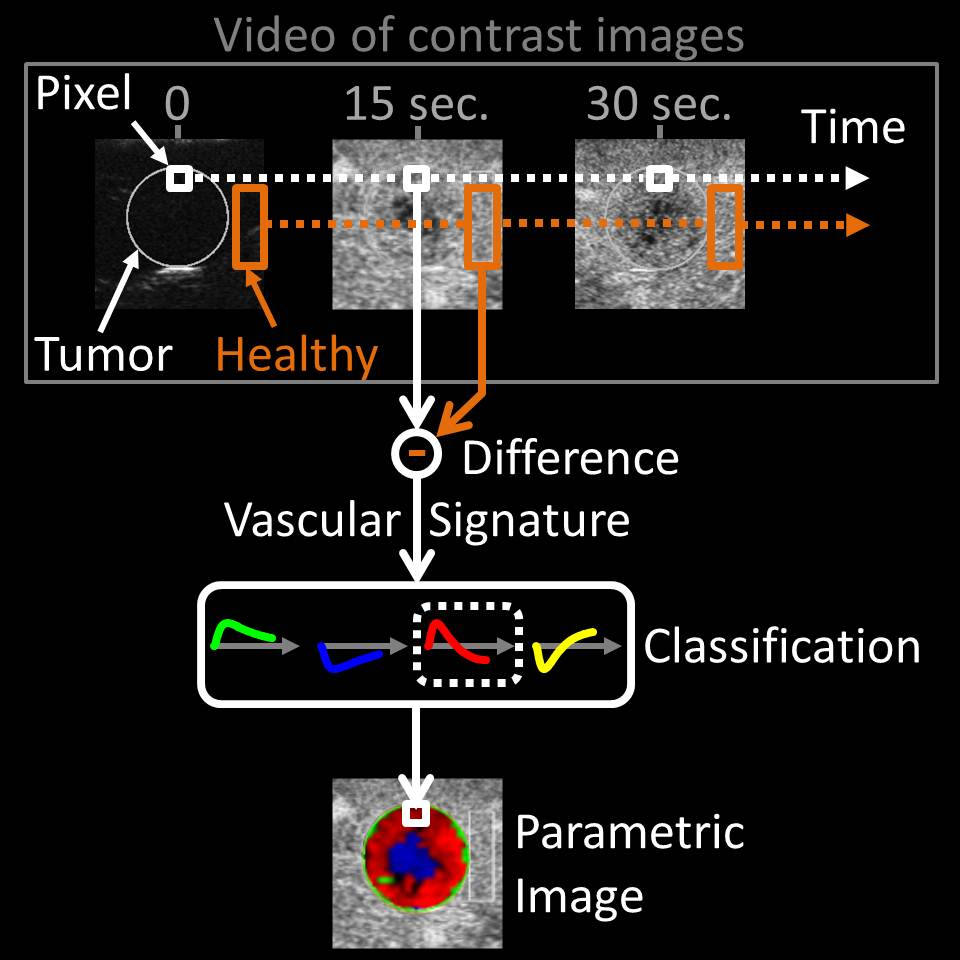
Parametric imaging of vascular signatures (diagram)

In oncological practice of medical contrast ultrasonography, clinicians use 'parametric imaging of vascular signatures' invented by Dr. Nicolas Rognin in 2010. This method is conceived as a cancer aided diagnostic tool, facilitating characterization of a suspicious tumor (malignant versus benign) in an organ. This method is based on medical computational science to analyze a time sequence of ultrasound contrast images, a digital video recorded in real-time during patient examination. Two consecutive signal processing steps are applied to each pixel of the tumor:

1. calculation of a vascular signature (contrast uptake difference with respect to healthy tissue surrounding the tumor);
2. automatic classification of the vascular signature into a unique parameter, the latter coded in one of the four following colors:
  - green for continuous hyper-enhancement (contrast uptake higher than healthy tissue one),
  - blue for continuous hypo-enhancement (contrast uptake lower than healthy tissue one),
  - red for fast hyper-enhancement (contrast uptake before healthy tissue one) or
  - yellow for fast hypo-enhancement (contrast uptake after healthy tissue one).

Once signal processing in each pixel is completed, a color spatial map of the parameter is displayed on a computer monitor, summarizing all vascular information of the tumor in a single image called a parametric image (see last figure of press article as clinical examples). This parametric image is interpreted by clinicians based on predominant colorization of the tumor: red indicates a suspicion of malignancy (risk of cancer), green or yellow – a high probability of benignity. In the first case (suspicion of malignant tumor), the clinician typically prescribes a biopsy to confirm the diagnostic or a CT scan examination as a second opinion. In the second case (quasi-certain of benign tumor), only a follow-up is needed with a contrast ultrasonography examination a few months later. The main clinical benefits are to avoid a systemic biopsy (with inherent risks of invasive procedures) of benign tumors or a CT scan examination exposing the patient to X-ray radiation. The parametric imaging of vascular signatures method proved to be effective in humans for characterization of tumors in the liver. In a cancer screening context, this method might be potentially applicable to other organs such as breast or prostate.

=== Molecular ultrasonography (ultrasound molecular imaging) ===
The current future of contrast ultrasonography is in molecular imaging with potential clinical applications expected in cancer screening to detect malignant tumors at their earliest stage of appearance. Molecular ultrasonography (or ultrasound molecular imaging) uses targeted microbubbles originally designed by Dr Alexander Klibanov in 1997; such targeted microbubbles specifically bind or adhere to tumoral microvessels by targeting biomolecular cancer expression (overexpression of certain biomolecules that occurs during neo-angiogenesis or inflammation in malignant tumors). As a result, a few minutes after their injection in blood circulation, the targeted microbubbles accumulate in the malignant tumor; facilitating its localization in a unique ultrasound contrast image. In 2013, the very first exploratory clinical trial in humans for prostate cancer was completed at Amsterdam in the Netherlands by Dr. Hessel Wijkstra.

In molecular ultrasonography, the technique of acoustic radiation force (also used for shear wave elastography) is applied in order to literally push the targeted microbubbles towards microvessels wall; first demonstrated by Dr. Paul Dayton in 1999. This allows maximization of binding to the malignant tumor; the targeted microbubbles being in more direct contact with cancerous biomolecules expressed at the inner surface of tumoral microvessels. At the stage of scientific preclinical research, the technique of acoustic radiation force was implemented as a prototype in clinical ultrasound systems and validated in vivo in 2D and 3D imaging modes.

=== Elastography (ultrasound elasticity imaging) ===
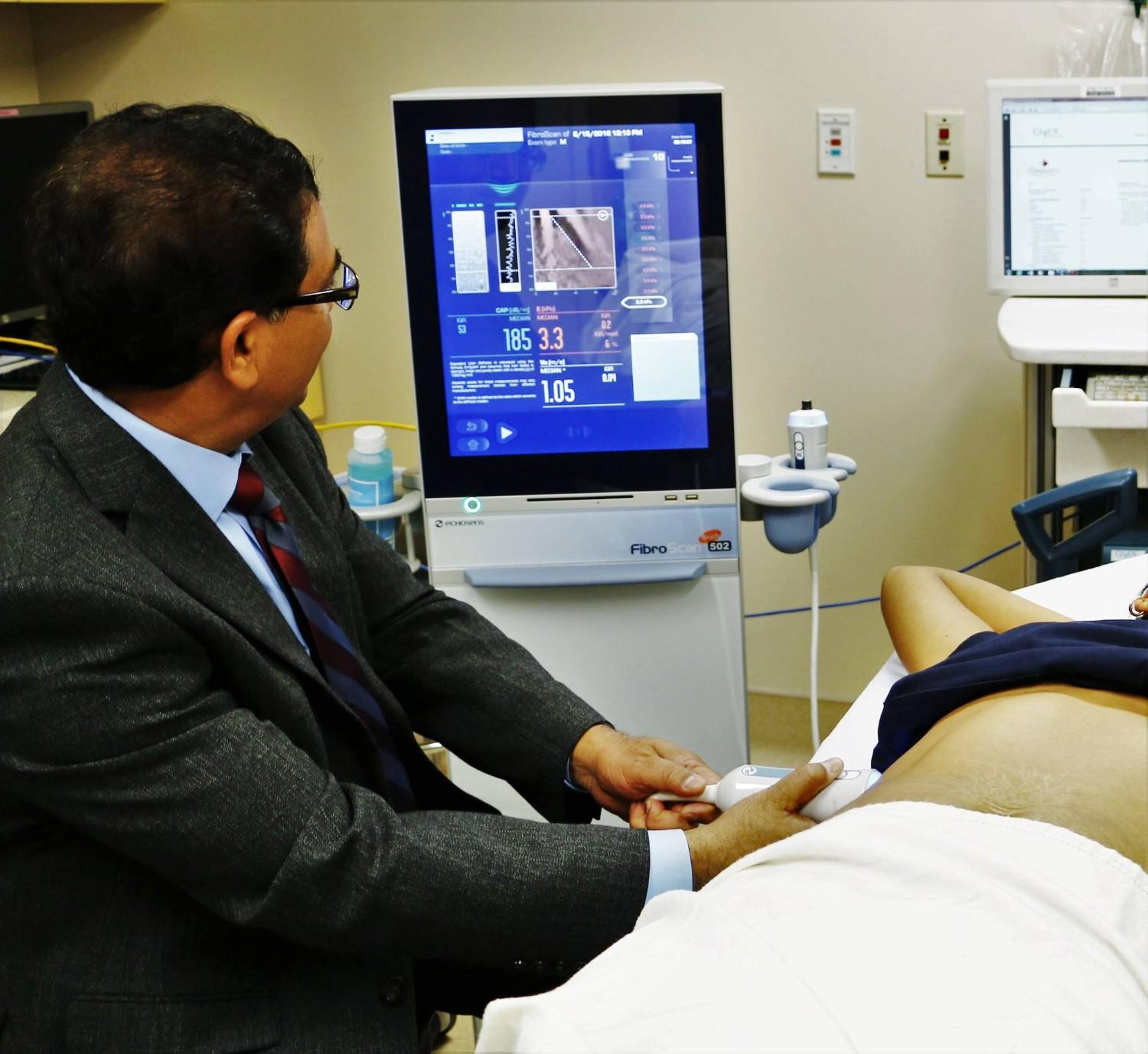
A Transient Elastography (FibroScan) readout showing Liver Stiffness Measurement (LSM) to assess fibrosis and Controlled Attenuation Parameter (CAP) to quantify hepatic steatosis (fatty liver).

Ultrasound is also used for elastography, which is a relatively new imaging modality that maps the elastic properties of soft tissue. This modality emerged in the last two decades. Elastography is useful in medical diagnoses as it can discern healthy from unhealthy tissue for specific organs/growths. For example, cancerous tumors will often be harder than the surrounding tissue, and diseased livers are stiffer than healthy ones.

There are many ultrasound elastography techniques.

=== Interventional ultrasonography ===
Interventional ultrasonography involves biopsy, emptying fluids, intrauterine Blood transfusion (Hemolytic disease of the newborn).

- Thyroid cysts: High frequency thyroid ultrasound (HFUS) can be used to treat several gland conditions. The recurrent thyroid cyst that was usually treated in the past with surgery, can be treated effectively by a new procedure called percutaneous ethanol injection, or PEI. With ultrasound guided placement of a 25 gauge needle within the cyst, and after evacuation of the cyst fluid, about 50% of the cyst volume is injected back into the cavity, under strict operator visualization of the needle tip. The procedure is 80% successful in reducing the cyst to minute size.
- Metastatic thyroid cancer neck lymph nodes: HFUS may also be used to treat metastatic thyroid cancer neck lymph nodes that occur in patients who either refuse, or are no longer candidates, for surgery. Small amounts of ethanol are injected under ultrasound guided needle placement. A power doppler blood flow study is done prior to injection. The blood flow can be destroyed and the node rendered inactive. Power doppler visualized blood flow can be eradicated, and there may be a drop in the cancer blood marker test, thyroglobulin, TG, as the node become non-functional. Another interventional use for HFUS is to mark a cancer node prior to surgery to help locate the node cluster at the surgery. A minute amount of methylene dye is injected, under careful ultrasound guided placement of the needle on the anterior surface, but not in the node. The dye will be evident to the thyroid surgeon when opening the neck. A similar localization procedure with methylene blue, can be done to locate parathyroid adenomas.
- Joint injections can be guided by medical ultrasound, such as in ultrasound-guided hip joint injections.

=== Compression ultrasonography ===
Compression ultrasonography is when the probe is pressed against the skin. This can bring the target structure closer to the probe, increasing spatial resolution of it. Comparison of the shape of the target structure before and after compression can aid in diagnosis.

It is used in ultrasonography of deep venous thrombosis, wherein absence of vein compressibility is a strong indicator of thrombosis. Compression ultrasonography has both high sensitivity and specificity for detecting proximal deep vein thrombosis in symptomatic patients. Results are not reliable when the patient is asymptomatic, for example in high risk postoperative orthopedic patients.

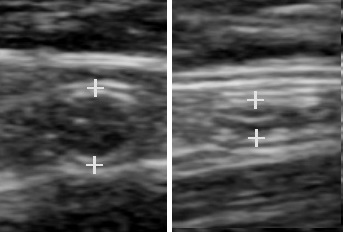
A normal appendix without and with compression. Absence of compressibility indicates appendicitis.

Compression is used in this ultrasonograph to get closer to the abdominal aorta, making the superior mesenteric vein and the inferior vena cava look rather flat.

=== Panoramic ultrasonography ===
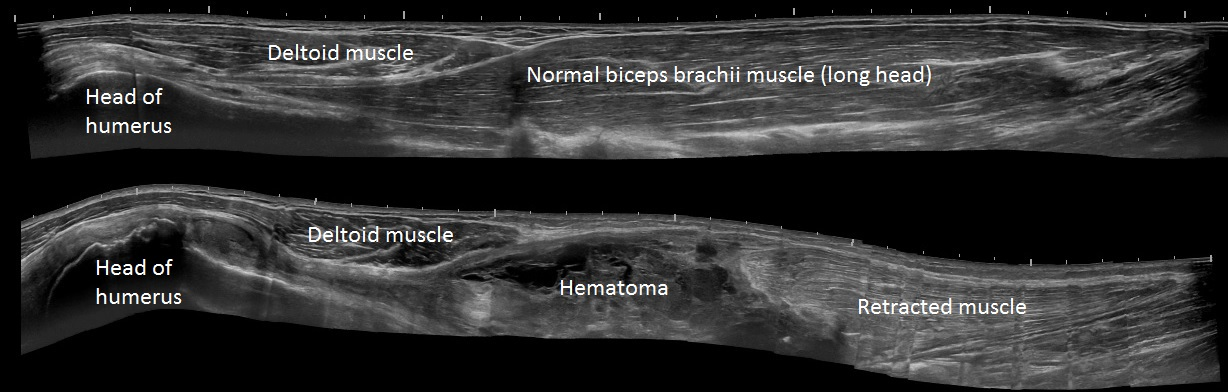
Panoramic ultrasonography of a proximal biceps tendon rupture. Top image shows the contralateral normal side, and lower image shows a retracted muscle, with a hematoma filling out the proximal space.

Panoramic ultrasonography is the digital stitching of multiple ultrasound images into a broader one. It can display an entire abnormality and show its relationship to nearby structures on a single image.

=== Multiparametric ultrasonography ===
Multiparametric ultrasonography (mpUSS) combines multiple ultrasound techniques to produce a composite result. For example, one study combined B-mode, colour Doppler, real-time elastography, and contrast-enhanced ultrasound, achieving an accuracy similar to that of multiparametric MRI.

=== Speed-of-Sound Imaging ===
Speed-of-sound (SoS) imaging aims to find the spatial distribution of the SoS within the tissue. The idea is to find relative delay measurements for different transmission events and solve the limited-angle tomographic reconstruction problem using delay measurements and transmission geometry. Compared to shear-wave elastography, SoS imaging has better ex-vivo tissue differentiation for benign and malignant tumors.

== Attributes ==
As with all imaging modalities, ultrasonography has positive and negative attributes.

=== Strengths ===
- Muscle, soft tissue, and bone surfaces are imaged very well including the delineation of interfaces between solid and fluid-filled spaces.
- "Live" images can be dynamically selected, permitting diagnosis and documentation often rapidly. Live images also permit ultrasound-guided biopsies or injections, which can be cumbersome with other imaging modalities.
- Images are provided in real-time.
- It is substantially lower in cost than other imaging strategies.
- Organ structure can be demonstrated.
- There are no known long-term side effects when used according to guidelines, and discomfort is minimal.
- Ability to image local variations in the mechanical properties of soft tissue.
- Equipment is widely available and comparatively flexible.
- Small, easily carried scanners are available which permit bedside examinations.
- Transducers have become relatively inexpensive compared to other modes of investigation, such as computed X-ray tomography, DEXA or magnetic resonance imaging.
- Spatial resolution is better in high frequency ultrasound transducers than most other imaging modalities.
- Use of an ultrasound research interface can offer a relatively inexpensive, real-time, and flexible method for capturing data required for specific research purposes of tissue characterization and development of new image processing techniques.

=== Weaknesses ===
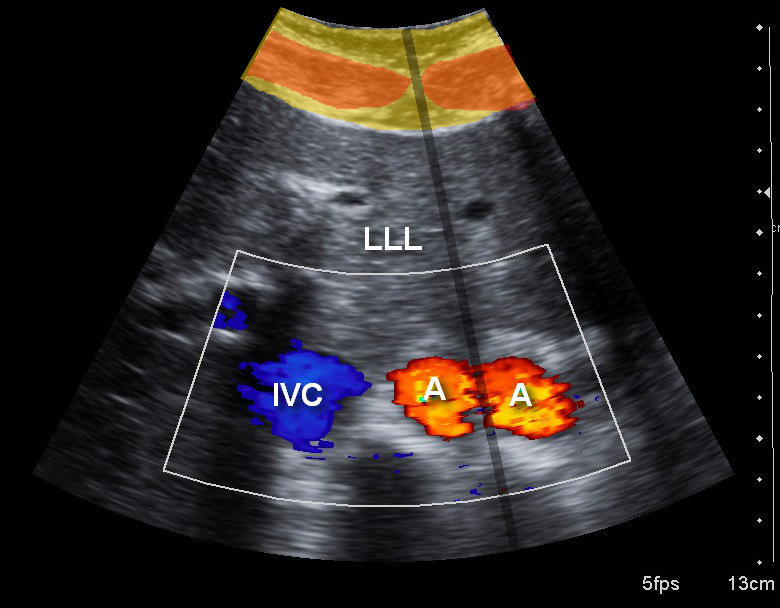
Double aorta artifact in sonography due to difference in velocity of sound waves in muscle and fat

- Sonographic devices have trouble penetrating bone. For example, sonography of the adult brain is currently very limited.
- Sonography performs very poorly when there is gas between the transducer and the organ of interest, due to the extreme differences in acoustic impedance. For example, overlying gas in the gastrointestinal tract often makes ultrasound scanning of the pancreas difficult. This is also the case for subcutaneous emphysema when attempting to examine the lungs. Lung imaging however can be useful in demarcating pleural effusions, detecting heart failure and pneumonia.
- Even in the absence of bone or air, the depth penetration of ultrasound may be limited depending on the frequency of imaging. Consequently, there might be difficulties imaging structures deep in the body, especially in obese patients.
- Image quality and accuracy of diagnosis is limited with obese patients and overlying subcutaneous fat attenuates the sound beam. A lower frequency transducer is required with subsequent lower resolution.
- The method needs patient cooperation.
- The method is operator-dependent. Skill and experience is needed to acquire good-quality images and make accurate diagnoses.
- There is no scout image as there is with CT and MRI. Once an image has been acquired there is no exact way to tell which part of the body was imaged.
- 80% of sonographers experience Repetitive Strain Injuries (RSI) or so-called Work-Related Musculoskeletal Disorders (WMSD) because of bad ergonomic positions.

Following research into patient cooperation, research into public perceptions of ultrasound has used social media listening to surface patient experiences not typically captured in clinical records. A 2025 study presented at the SPIE Medical Imaging conference analysed posts across Twitter, Threads, Facebook, and social forums using Pulsar platform alongside topic modelling and retrieval-augmented generation. Key themes identified as weaknesses included delays in scheduling and poor communication from providers, alongside positive associations between practitioner professionalism and patient trust, suggesting social media data could serve as a complementary evidence base for optimising diagnostic practice and patient-provider relationships in sonography.

== Risks and side-effects ==
Ultrasonography is generally considered safe imaging, with the World Health Organization stating:

"Diagnostic ultrasound is recognized as a safe, effective, and highly flexible imaging modality capable of providing clinically relevant information about most parts of the body in a rapid and cost-effective fashion".

Diagnostic ultrasound studies of the fetus are generally considered to be safe during pregnancy. However, this diagnostic procedure should be performed only when there is a valid medical indication, and the lowest possible ultrasonic exposure setting should be used to gain the necessary diagnostic information under the "as low as reasonably practicable" or ALARP principle.

Although there is no evidence that ultrasound could be harmful to the fetus, medical authorities typically strongly discourage the promotion, selling, or leasing of ultrasound equipment for making "keepsake fetal videos".

=== Studies on the safety of ultrasound ===
- A meta-analysis of several ultrasonography studies published in 2000 found no statistically significant harmful effects from ultrasonography. It was noted that there is a lack of data on long-term substantive outcomes such as neurodevelopment.
- A study at the Yale School of Medicine published in 2006 found a small but significant correlation between prolonged and frequent use of ultrasound and abnormal neuronal migration in mice.
- A study performed in Sweden in 2001 has shown that subtle effects of neurological damage linked to ultrasound were implicated by an increased incidence in left-handedness in boys (a marker for brain problems when not hereditary) and speech delays.
  - The above findings, however, were not confirmed in a follow-up study.
  - A later study, however, performed on a larger sample of 8865 children, has established a statistically significant, albeit weak association of ultrasonography exposure and being non-right handed later in life.

== Regulation ==
Diagnostic and therapeutic ultrasound equipment is regulated in the US by the Food and Drug Administration, and worldwide by other national regulatory agencies. The FDA limits acoustic output using several metrics; generally, other agencies accept the FDA-established guidelines.

Currently, New Mexico, Oregon, and North Dakota are the only US states that regulate diagnostic medical sonographers. Certification examinations for sonographers are available in the US from three organizations: the American Registry for Diagnostic Medical Sonography, Cardiovascular Credentialing International and the American Registry of Radiologic Technologists.

The primary regulated metrics are Mechanical Index (MI), a metric associated with the cavitation bio-effect, and Thermal Index (TI) a metric associated with the tissue heating bio-effect. The FDA requires that the machine not exceed established limits, which are reasonably conservative in an effort to maintain diagnostic ultrasound as a safe imaging modality. This requires self-regulation on the part of the manufacturer in terms of machine calibration.

Ultrasound-based pre-natal care and sex screening technologies were launched in India in the 1980s. With concerns about its misuse for sex-selective abortion, the Government of India passed the Pre-natal Diagnostic Techniques Act (PNDT) in 1994 to distinguish and regulate legal and illegal uses of ultrasound equipment. The law was further amended as the Pre-Conception and Pre-natal Diagnostic Techniques (Regulation and Prevention of Misuse) (PCPNDT) Act in 2004 to deter and punish prenatal sex screening and sex selective abortion. It is currently illegal and a punishable crime in India to determine or disclose the sex of a fetus using ultrasound equipment.

== Use in other animals ==
Ultrasound is also a valuable tool in veterinary medicine, offering the same non-invasive imaging that helps in the diagnosis and monitoring of conditions in animals.

== History ==
After the French physicist Pierre Curie's discovery of piezoelectricity in 1880, ultrasonic waves could be deliberately generated for industry. In 1940, the American acoustical physicist Floyd Firestone devised the first ultrasonic echo imaging device, the Supersonic Reflectoscope, to detect internal flaws in metal castings. In 1941, Austrian neurologist Karl Theo Dussik, in collaboration with his brother, Friedrich, a physicist, was likely the first person to image the human body ultrasonically, outlining the ventricles of a human brain. Ultrasonic energy was first applied to the human body for medical purposes by Dr George Ludwig at the Naval Medical Research Institute, Bethesda, Maryland, in the late 1940s. English-born physicist John Wild (1914–2009) first used ultrasound to assess the thickness of bowel tissue as early as 1949; he has been described as the "father of medical ultrasound". Subsequent advances took place concurrently in several countries but it was not until 1961 that David Robinson and George Kossoff's work at the Australian Department of Health resulted in the first commercially practical water bath ultrasonic scanner. In 1963 Meyerdirk & Wright launched production of the first commercial, hand-held, articulated arm, compound contact B-mode scanner, which made ultrasound generally available for medical use.

=== France ===
Léandre Pourcelot, a researcher and teacher at INSA (Institut National des Sciences Appliquées), Lyon, co-published a report in 1965 at the Académie des sciences, "Effet Doppler et mesure du débit sanguin" ("Doppler effect and measure of the blood flow"), the basis of his design of a Doppler flow meter in 1967.

=== Scotland ===
Parallel developments in Glasgow, Scotland by Professor Ian Donald and colleagues at the Glasgow Royal Maternity Hospital (GRMH) led to the first diagnostic applications of the technique. Donald was an obstetrician with a self-confessed "childish interest in machines, electronic and otherwise", who, having treated the wife of one of the company's directors, was invited to visit the Research Department of boilermakers Babcock & Wilcox at Renfrew. He adapted their industrial ultrasound equipment to conduct experiments on various anatomical specimens and assess their ultrasonic characteristics. Together with the medical physicist Tom Brown. and fellow obstetrician John MacVicar, Donald refined the equipment to enable differentiation of pathology in live volunteer patients. These findings were reported in The Lancet on June 7, 1958 as "Investigation of Abdominal Masses by Pulsed Ultrasound" – possibly one of the most important papers published in the field of diagnostic medical imaging.

At GRMH, Professor Donald and James Willocks then refined their techniques to obstetric applications including fetal head measurement to assess the size and growth of the fetus. With the opening of the new Queen Mother's Hospital in Yorkhill in 1964, it became possible to improve these methods even further. Stuart Campbell's pioneering work on fetal cephalometry led to it acquiring long-term status as the definitive method of study of foetal growth. As the technical quality of the scans was further developed, it soon became possible to study pregnancy from start to finish and diagnose its many complications such as multiple pregnancy, fetal abnormality and placenta praevia. Diagnostic ultrasound has since been imported into practically every other area of medicine.

=== Sweden ===
Medical ultrasonography was used in 1953 at Lund University by cardiologist Inge Edler and Gustav Ludwig Hertz's son Carl Hellmuth Hertz, who was then a graduate student at the university's department of nuclear physics.

Edler had asked Hertz if it was possible to use radar to look into the body, but Hertz said this was impossible. However, he said, it might be possible to use ultrasonography. Hertz was familiar with using ultrasonic reflectoscopes of the American acoustical physicist Floyd Firestone's invention for nondestructive materials testing, and together Edler and Hertz developed the idea of applying this methodology in medicine.

The first successful measurement of heart activity was made on October 29, 1953, using a device borrowed from the ship construction company Kockums in Malmö. On December 16 the same year, the method was applied to generate an echo-encephalogram (ultrasonic probe of the brain). Edler and Hertz published their findings in 1954.

=== United States ===
In 1962, after about two years of work, Joseph Holmes, William Wright, and Ralph Meyerdirk developed the first compound contact B-mode scanner. Their work had been supported by U.S. Public Health Services and the University of Colorado. Wright and Meyerdirk left the university to form Physionic Engineering Inc., which launched the first commercial hand-held articulated arm compound contact B-mode scanner in 1963. This was the start of the most popular design in the history of ultrasound scanners.

In the late 1960s Gene Strandness and the bio-engineering group at the University of Washington conducted research on Doppler ultrasound as a diagnostic tool for vascular disease. Eventually, they developed technologies to use duplex imaging, or Doppler in conjunction with B-mode scanning, to view vascular structures in real time while also providing hemodynamic information.

The first demonstration of color Doppler was by Geoff Stevenson, who was involved in the early developments and medical use of Doppler shifted ultrasonic energy.

== Manufacturers ==
Major manufacturers of Medical Ultrasound Devices and Equipment are:

- (Japan) Canon Medical Systems Corporation
- (Italy) Esaote
- (United States) GE Healthcare
- (Japan) Fujifilm
- (China) Mindray Medical International Limited
- (Netherlands) Koninklijke Philips N.V.
- (South Korea) Samsung Medison
- (Germany) Siemens Healthineers

== Gallery ==
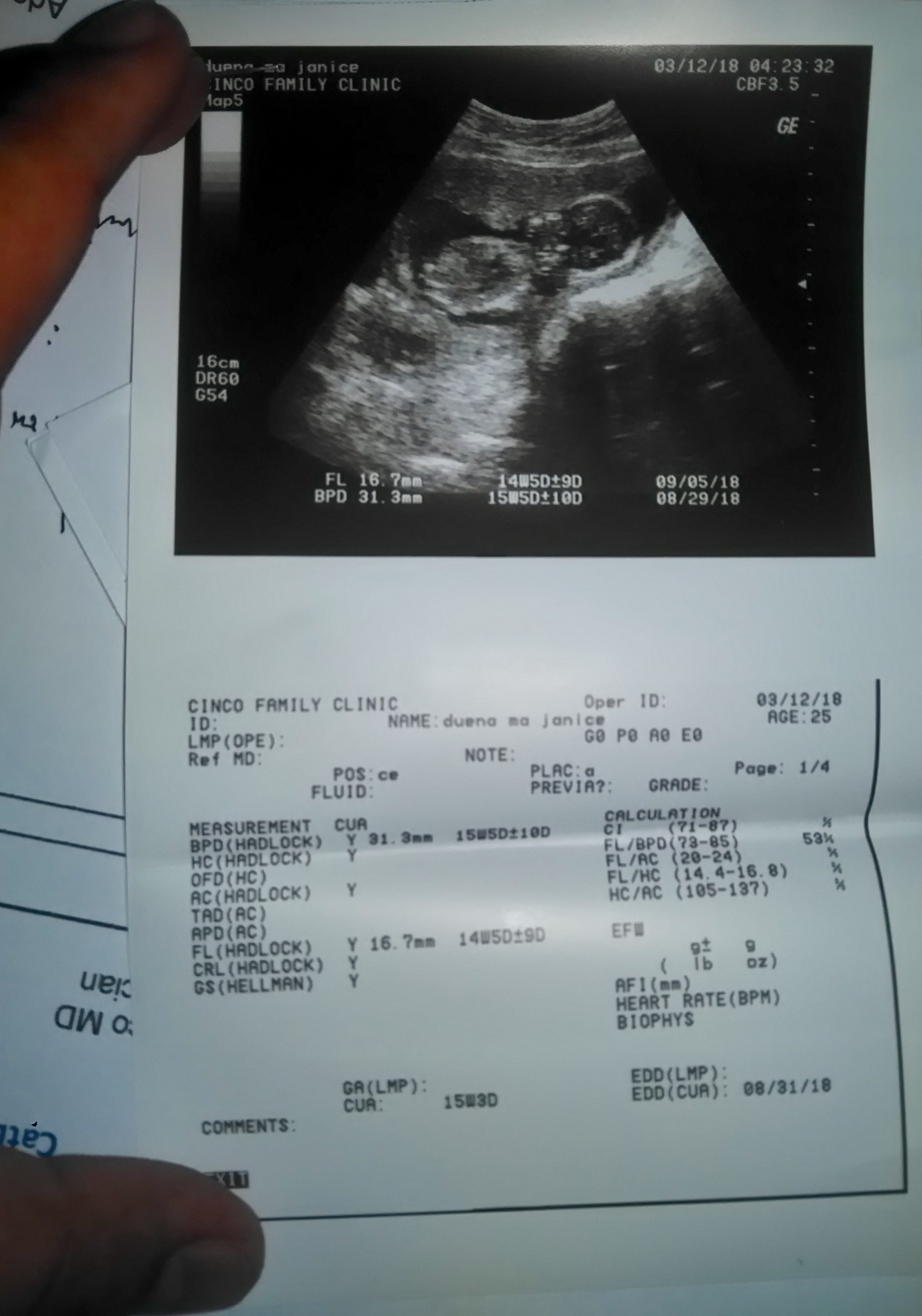
An ultrasound result on fetal biometry printed on a piece of paper

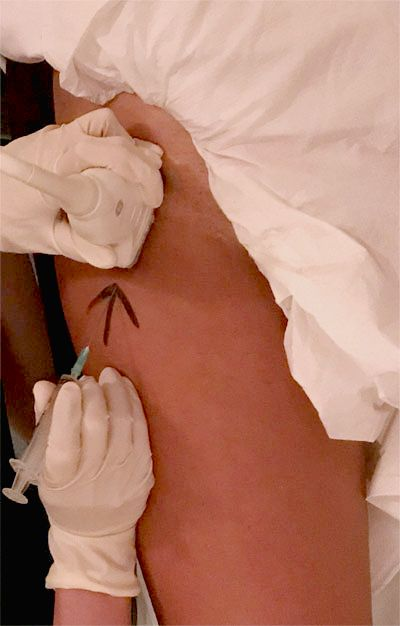
Ultrasound-guided hip joint injection

== See also ==
- Ultrasound (3D ultrasound)
- Doppler fetal monitor
- Elastography
- POCUS
- Polybiography
- Radiographer
- Voluson 730
