= Fracture sonography =

Use of ultrasound to detect bone fractures

- Purpose: ultrasound detects bone fractures.

Fracture sonography is the use of medical ultrasound to detect bone fractures. While medical ultrasound is used to visualize soft tissues like skin, organs, and blood vessels, fracture sonography is used to visualize fractures on only bone surfaces. It is useful for children aged 12 or younger because all fractures cause alterations of the bone surface, and joint fractures are uncommon at such ages. For joint fractures that are common in adult bones and cannot be visualized properly, patients older than 12 years are not eligible for ultrasound fracture diagnosis. The method is feasible for detecting fractures of the wrist, elbow, shoulder and clavicle. The advantages of fracture sonography are the avoidance of radiation exposure, faster examinations, and the ability to use standard ultrasound devices, which are more widespread. In the mentioned fields of application, ultrasound is as safe as X-ray diagnosis.

== Application ==
=== Physical basis ===
In fracture sonography, regular 4 to 12 MHz linear transducers are used in B-Mode (Medical ultrasonography) with standard ultrasound devices. The high-impedance difference between bone and soft tissue causes an almost complete reflection of the acoustic waves at the bone's surface. As a result, the bone surface is seen, and the underlying structures are not seen.

=== Visualization and limitations ===
With fracture sonography, the surface of nearly all extremity bones not covered by other bones can be seen. Thus, the joint facets cannot be accessed. Vertebral structures are not suitable for ultrasound fracture diagnosis.

The additional imaging of soft tissue like haematomas, joint effusion, and blood vessels is an advantage over to X-ray-imaging.

Due to the size of the linear transducer, only a limited section of the bone can be visualized, so longer fractures may require step-by-step assessments.

=== Diagnosis ===
Fracture sonography is suitable for the diagnosis of fractures of the shaft and metaphysis of bones. Because only the cortical surface can be visualized, sonography is suitable only for specific fractures. Joint fractures cannot be assessed properly. Sonography is feasible only in the growing bone.

For adult patients, sonography can be used to rule out an increasing deformity of fractures.

== Applications ==
=== Wrist fractures ===
In patients younger than 12, wrist fractures cause specific alterations at the surface of the bone (bulge, angulation, offset or fracture gap), and through diagnosis and treatment can be identified without X-ray imaging. Intra-articular fractures are rare and require X-ray imaging. The standard procedure is the wrist SAFE algorithm. The sensitivity of the method in comparison with X-ray imaging is 96 percent, the specificity is 100 percent, the positive predictive value is 1, and the negative predictive value is 0.88.

=== Elbow fractures ===
In patients younger than 12, intra-articular fractures of the elbow can be ruled out through sonography. Because intra-articular fractures cause a joint effusion, the dorsal fat pad sign is a reliable parameter for diagnosis of elbow fractures. If a joint effusion is depicted in the ultrasound, two-plane X-ray imagery is necessary to diagnose the fracture. The standard procedure is the elbow-SAFE algorithm. The sensitivity of the method in comparison with X-ray imaging is 97.9 percent, the specificity is 95 percent, the positive predictive value is 0.95, and the negative predictive value is 0.98.

=== Proximal humerus fracture ===
In patients younger than 12, proximal humerus fractures can be visualized due to the changes at the bone surface. Because bone tumors can appear at this location, X-ray imaging is necessary following a fracture diagnosis. The standard procedure is the shoulder-SAFE algorithm. The sensitivity of the method in comparison with X-ray imaging is 94.4 percent, and the specificity is 100 percent.

=== Clavicle fracture ===
In patients younger than 12, clavicle fractures are common. They can be visualized using sonography and are mostly treated conservatively. The clavicle's proximity to the throat and its curved shape can complicate an examination.

== Risks ==
The side effects are identical to those of regular sonography. The examination causes no radiation exposure.

In the case of an unstable fracture, the examination can disrupt the bones because the splint or cast must be removed beforehand.

=== Documentation ===
Thorough labeling is important because a specific bone cannot be identified on a printout.

== Alternatives ==
X-ray imagery is the primary alternative to sonography. Sonography is 25 minutes faster, and the pain is reduced from 1.7 to 1.2 (visual analog scale VAS 0–5).

== History ==
Fracture sonography's first papers were published in 1986 by Leitgeb. Since then, numerous trials have been published. Sonography has not become the standard diagnostic procedure because X-ray facilities exist worldwide. However, fracture sonography's demonstrated sensitivity and specificity may boost its popularity in the future.
