= Polybiography =

A Polybiography is the use of archived internet email services such as ListServs and WWWeb to publish historical information by those involved in the history. The historical web site and ListServ provide for formal historical articles, images, photographs, commentary, and discussion of those items in a process called a "polybiography"... the history by many of the many events. The site is designed to be a searchable repository of "raw material" for those with an interest in the history of Diagnostic Medical Sonography (ultrasonography).

This Internet based historical archive has been referred to as a "polybiography" because it is both biographical and autobiographical; the many individuals involved write the history of the many events discussed. The resulting archive is expected to be similar to an oral history where an editor records and transcribes the various stories into a cohesive narrative. However, the oral history will have a slant due to the selection of participants and how they are edited. The polybiography will avoid a bias or slant from an editor because the participants are self-selected. The stories will be in the unedited words of the individuals who made the history. The primary problem anticipated will be the differences in individuals' writing styles, and a possibly confused organization.

The polybiography is uniquely adapted to the Internet and would be virtually impossible without the Internet. Without the global connections it would be difficult to locate all the individuals who contributed to the development of historical events. By the use of the Internet anyone who has a story to tell about the developments will be able to add to the history. This will allow those who were assistants to contribute, as well as the luminaries; whereas with the traditional oral history, the editor might not locate some relatively minor, relocated participants.

The concept of the "polybiography" was first presented at the Annual Conference 2000 of the American Association of History & Computing in Waco, Texas. The original article was titled "Poly-autobiography of Diagnostic Medical Sonography", but during the discussion following the presentation it was suggested that, while the concept was thought to be a unique use of the Internet and WWWeb, the term "polybiography" would be more appropriate, more descriptive, and simpler.
