= Ultrasound-guided hip joint injection =

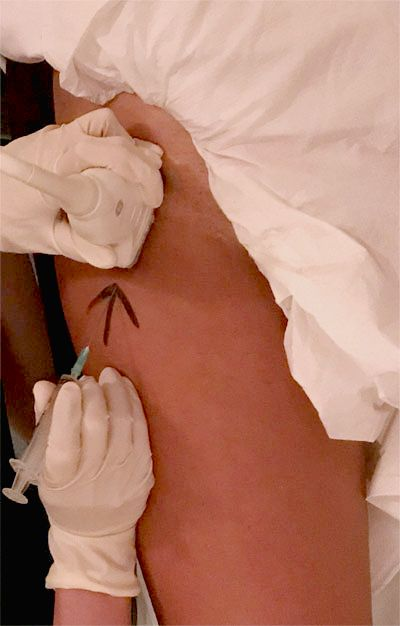
Anterior longitudinal approach. An arrow parallel to the long axis of the transducer is drawn on the skin adjacent to the end of transducer where the needle will be introduced.

Ultrasound-guided hip joint injection is a joint injection in the hip, assisted by medical ultrasound. Hip and groin pain often presents a diagnostic and therapeutic challenge. The differential diagnosis is extensive, comprising intra-articular and extra-articular pathology and referred pain from lumbar spine, knee and elsewhere in the pelvis. Various ultrasound-guided techniques have been described in the hip and groin region for diagnostic and therapeutic purposes. Ultrasound has many advantages over other imaging modalities, including portability, lack of ionizing radiation and real-time visualization of soft tissues and neurovascular structures. Many studies have demonstrated the safety, accuracy and efficacy of ultrasound-guided techniques, although there is lack of standardization regarding the injectates used and long-term benefit remains uncertain.

== Introduction ==
The hip and groin are sites of multiple injuries and inflammatory conditions, including intra-articular and extra-articular pathology, giving rise to an extensive differential diagnosis for hip and groin pain. Pain originating from different anatomical areas such as lumbar spine, knee and pelvis can also be referred to the hip and groin. Often, patients with hip conditions have concomitant knee or spine conditions, which may present difficult therapeutic and diagnostic dilemmas. Given the complexity of hip and groin anatomy and clinical conditions, imaging-guided injections are useful both for the diagnostic workup and treatment. The main advantages of ultrasound-guided injection are its safety, portability and lack of ionising radiation. Injectates can include corticosteroid, local anaesthetic, platelet-rich plasma (PRP), viscosupplement and dextrose prolotherapy.

The total volume injected is usually 6–7ml.

== General principles for ultrasound-guided injection ==
Usual standards for musculoskeletal interventional procedures apply include review of previous imaging, informed consent and appropriate local anesthetic. The use of a high-frequency (> 10 MHz) linear array transducer is recommended, but lower-frequency curvilinear probes may be occasionally required to visualize deep structures in larger patients. A preliminary diagnostic sonographic examination, including color Doppler of the area to be punctured is necessary to define the relationship of adjacent neurovascular structures.

Injections should be performed with adherence to aseptic technique although this varies between institutions and radiologists attributable to resources, training, perceived risk and experience. In a survey of 250 health professionals in the United Kingdom, 43.5% believed infection rates were < 1/1000 following intra-articular injections, 33.0% perceived rates were < 1/100, and 2.6% perceived the risk as negligible. Sterile preparation of the entire injection field, including adjacent skin where the gel and probe are applied, is recommended. Areas of superficial infection such as cellulitis or abscess should be avoided to prevent deeper spread.

Before sterile preparation, the procedure often begins with a preliminary sonography in order to determine a safe route of access. At this point, an evaluate may also be performed over the joint area for any joint effusion, or any thickening or hyperemia of the joint capsule. A line parallel to the long axis of the transducer can be drawn on the skin adjacent to the end of transducer in order to mark where the needle will be introduced.

Once the patient’s skin is sterilized and initial needle entry is made adjacent to the mark, the probe can be returned quickly to the same location and orientation by aligning to the skin mark. The needle is directed toward the intended target by a freehand technique. The needle size, length and type should be selected based on the site, depth and patient’s body habitus. 22–24G needles are sufficed for most injections.

The risk of clinically significant bleeding is minimal, so coagulation tests are not needed before the procedure. It can for example be performed during chronic warfarin therapy with therapeutic coagulation levels.

== Anatomy ==
The hip joint is a ball-and-socket synovial joint, formed by an articulation between the femur and acetabulum. Intra-articular etiology of hip pain includes osteoarthritis, inflammatory arthropathy, acetabular labral tears and femoro-acetabular impingement. Injection of short and long acting anesthetic agents can be useful in confirming hip pathology and differentiating asymptomatic intra-articular pathology from extra-articular conditions that may be the source of symptoms. Complete relief of hip pain following intra-articular injection of local anaesthetic is associated with good surgical outcome following joint replacement.

== Injection approach ==
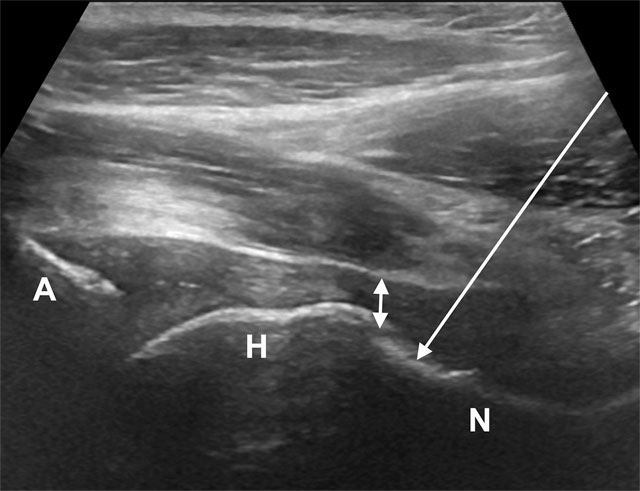
Anterior longitudinal approach. The needle is introduced from an inferior and anterior approach, lateral to the femoral neurovascular bundle (arrow). A, acetabulum; H, femoral head; N, femoral neck; double arrow – anterior joint recess.

Two common anterior approaches are typically used both with the patient lying supine:

- The anterior longitudinal approach: the probe is aligned along the long axis of the femoral neck. The needle is introduced from an anteroinferior approach and is passed into the anterior joint recess at the femoral head-neck junction.

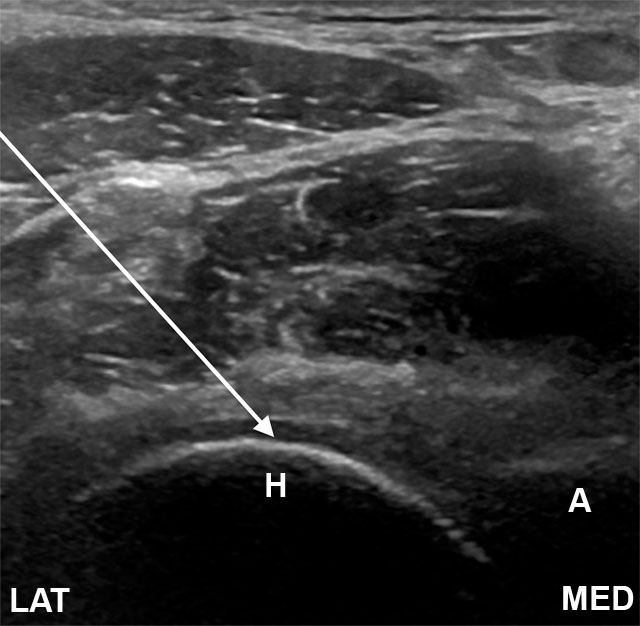
Anterolateral approach, here shown as a transverse image. The needle will rest on the femoral head (arrow). A, acetabulum; H, femoral head; N, femoral neck; LAT, lateral; MED, medial.

- The anterolateral approach, with the ultrasound probe oriented axially and the femoral head and acetabular rim in view. This often shortens the distance from needle skin entry to joint compared to the longitudinal approach making it a useful approach in larger patients. The introduced needle remains lateral to the femoral neurovascular bundle, and the needle is advanced until its tip rests on the femoral head.
- A low-frequency curvilinear probe (5-2 MHz), coated with a glue sterile dressing table, is put in a transverse plane parallel to the inguinal ligament and utilized to recognize the femoral artery and vein over the hyperechoic femoral head. The probe is then transferred laterally to just over the hyper-echoic femoral head and rotated into an oblique sagittal place so the probe mark is targeted towards the umbilicus.
- Needle insertion and shot . A shallow wheal of local anesthetic is set in the stage of needle entrance. A 6 tsp mix of 5ml of bupivacaine 0.5percent and 1ml of 40 mg/ml of triamcinolone is put in a 10cc syringe. A 20-gauge 3.5 inch regular cutting back spinal needle is directed in-plane under real time ultrasound guidance into the anterior capsular recess. After the needle tip is clearly visualized from the joint area, 1--2 mL aliquots of this solution is gradually injected under reduced pressure. Successful targeting of the joint space is supported by spread of anechoic fluid beneath the iliofemoral fascia inside the anterior capsular recess.

== Comparison to other methods ==
Initial treatment options include activity modification, analgesia and physical therapy. When symptoms persist despite these measures, hip injections can be considered. Intra-articular hip injections can be technically challenging due to depth, variable body habitus, and the proximity to the femoral neurovascular bundle. Image guidance is therefore advocated to ensure safe and accurate needle placement. Fluoroscopic-guidance was the mainstay imaging-guidance hip injection, but ultrasound-guidance is becoming increasingly prevalent due to its accuracy with visualization of soft tissue and neurovascular structures, less associated cost and no ionizing radiation exposure or risk of contrast agent reactions. A position statement by the American Medical Society for Sports Medicine reviewed the literature and found several level one studies of ultrasound guided hip injections with a mean accuracy of 99%. In addition, a recent meta-analysis revealed that ultrasound-guided hip joint injections were significantly more accurate than landmark-guided intra-articular hip injections (accuracies were 100%, 95%CI 98–100%; 72%, 95%CI 56–85%, respectively).

To date, many trials examining efficacy of intra-articular corticosteroid injection for osteoarthritis, either under fluoroscopy or ultrasound-guidance, have revealed short-term improvement of hip pain, though no reliable predictors of response to intra-articular corticosteroid injections have been identified. While it has been shown that no significant difference in terms of effectiveness between fluoroscopy and ultrasound-guided corticosteroid hip injection, it has been reported that ultrasound-guided injections were less painful and preferred by patients.

== Injectates in osteoarthritis ==
For pain relief in osteoarthritis, the injectate may be for example:

- Local anesthetic

- 25mg bupivacaine (such as 5ml of Marcaine 0.5%)

- Glucocorticoid, for example:

- 40mg triamcinolone (such as 1ml of 40 mg/ml)

== Efficacy in osteoarthritis ==
In osteoarthritis, joint injection of glucocorticoids leads to short term pain relief, with onset after 2 to 7 days, that may last between a few weeks and a few months. A local anesthetic reduces pain from 15 to 20 minutes after the injection, and lasts about 4 to 6 hours.

Injections of hyaluronic acid have not produced improvement compared to placebo for knee arthritis, but did increase risk of further pain.
