= Joint injection =

Method of delivering drugs into a joint

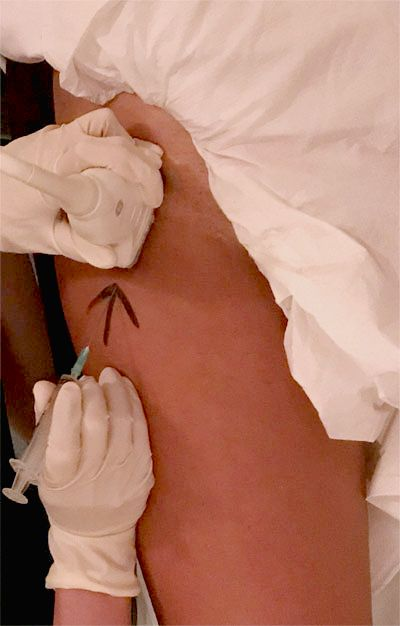
- Ultrasound-guided hip joint injection: A skin mark is made to mark the optimal point of entry for the needle.
- Specialty: Orthopedics
- [edit on Wikidata]

In medicine, a joint injection (intra-articular injection) is a procedure used in the treatment of inflammatory joint conditions, such as rheumatoid arthritis, psoriatic arthritis, gout, tendinitis, bursitis, Carpal Tunnel Syndrome, and occasionally osteoarthritis. A hypodermic needle is injected into the affected joint where it delivers a dose of any one of many anti-inflammatory agents, the most common of which are corticosteroids. Hyaluronic acid, because of its high viscosity, is sometimes used to replace bursa fluids. The technique may be used to also withdraw excess fluid from the joint.

== Efficacy in osteoarthritis ==
In osteoarthritis, joint injection of glucocorticoids (such as hydrocortisone) leads to short term pain relief that may last between a few weeks and a few months. Injections of hyaluronic acid have not produced improvement compared to placebo for knee arthritis, but did increase risk of further pain. In ankle osteoarthritis, evidence is unclear. The effectiveness of injections of platelet-rich plasma is unclear; there are suggestions that such injections improve function but not pain, and are associated with increased risk.

A 2015 Cochrane review found that intra-articular corticosteroid injections of the knee did not benefit quality of life and had no effect on knee joint space; clinical effects one to six weeks after injection could not be determined clearly due to poor study quality. Another 2015 study reported negative effects of intra-articular corticosteroid injections at higher doses, and a 2017 trial showed reduction in cartilage thickness with intra-articular triamcinolone every 12 weeks for 2 years compared to placebo. A 2018 study found that intra-articular triamcinolone is associated with an increase in intraocular pressure.

== Ultrasound-guided ==
Usual standards for musculoskeletal interventional procedures apply, including review of prior imaging, informed consent, and appropriate local anesthesia. A high-frequency (>10 MHz) linear array transducer is recommended, though lower-frequency curvilinear probes may be needed to visualize deep structures in larger patients. A preliminary diagnostic ultrasound, including color Doppler of the target area, is necessary to assess adjacent neurovascular structures.

Injections should be performed with adherence to aseptic technique although this varies between institutions and radiologists attributable to resources, training, perceived risk and experience. In a survey of 250 health professionals in the United Kingdom, 43.5% believed infection rates were < 1/1000 following intra-articular injections, 33.0% perceived rates were < 1/100, and 2.6% perceived the risk as negligible. Sterile preparation of the entire injection field, including adjacent skin where the gel and probe are applied, is recommended. Areas of superficial infection such as cellulitis or abscess should be avoided to prevent deeper spread.

After planning a safe route of access, a line parallel to the long axis of the transducer is drawn on the skin adjacent to the end of transducer where the needle will be introduced. Once the patient's skin is sterilized and initial needle entry is made adjacent to the mark, the probe can be returned quickly to the same location and orientation by aligning to the skin mark. The needle is directed toward the intended target by a freehand technique. The needle size, length and type should be selected based on the site, depth and patient's body habitus. 22–24G needles are sufficed for most injections.

As an example, ultrasound-guided hip joint injection can be considered when symptoms persist despite initial treatment options such as activity modification, analgesia and physical therapy.
