= Alexander Klibanov (biologist) =

Russian-American biomedical engineer

- Education: Russian Academy of Medical Sciences
- Known for: Targeted contrast media for molecular ultrasonography
- Awards: Lenin Komsomol Prize (1988) — co-laureate
- Scientific career
- Fields: Biochemistry; Molecular Imaging; Medical ultrasonography
- Workplaces: University of Virginia

Alexander L. (Sasha) Klibanov (Russian: Александр Л. Клибанов) is associate professor in the Division of Cardiovascular Medicine and Department of Biomedical Engineering at the University of Virginia. He specializes in the study of ultrasound and medical imaging techniques.

== Targeted microbubbles ==
Dr. Klibanov designed targeted microbubbles in 1997 that launched a new medical imaging modality, named molecular ultrasonography or ultrasound molecular imaging. Potential clinical applications are expected in cancer screening to detect malignant tumors at their earliest stage of appearance; with intravenous injection of targeted microbubbles that specifically bind to tumoral microvessels by targeting biomolecular cancer expression (overexpression of certain biomolecules occurs during neo-angiogenesis or inflammation processes).

== Sources ==
- University of Virginia bio page of Kilbanov
