= George Ludwig =

American academic

Dr. George Döring Ludwig
- Born: January 4, 1922; Johnstown, Pennsylvania, U.S.
- Died: November 24, 1973 (aged 51); Ohio, U.S.
- Occupation(s): Professor & Chairman of Medicine, Medical Researcher
- Spouse: Rosemary Lynch Ludwig (deceased September 3, 1963 age 39)

George Döring Ludwig, M.D. (January 4, 1922 – November 24, 1973) was an American Professor and Chairman of medicine and medical researcher, noted for developing the first application of ultrasound to the human body for medical purposes at the Naval Medical Research Institute, Bethesda, Maryland, in the late 1940s.

Ludwig received his Bachelor of Science degree in chemistry from St. Vincent College in 1944 and then his medical degree from the University of Pennsylvania in 1946. After his graduation, Ludwig was on active duty as junior Lieutenant at the Naval Medical Research Institute in Bethesda, Maryland. While at the research institute, Dr. Ludwig's research was initially focussed on detecting gallstones. He wrote the first paper in the United States on diagnostic ultrasound for medical purposes based on his research. His work was considered classified by the Dept. of Defense until October 1949 at which time it was released to the public. He was the founding chairman of the Department of Medicine of the Medical College of Ohio.
