= Alexander Klibanov (chemist) =

Alexander Klibanov is the Novartis Professor of Biological Engineering and Chemistry at the Massachusetts Institute of Technology and a member of the National Academy of Sciences. He was also elected a member of the National Academy of Engineering (1993) for research in enzyme and protein technology and contributions to the field of biocatalysis in nonaqueous solvents.

He is most notable for greatly advancing the field of non-aqueous enzymology, that is, developing methods to allow enzymes to function in media such as organic solvents, rather than water.

Klibanov earned a Master of Science in chemistry and a PhD in chemical enzymology from Moscow University in Russia. He joined MIT as assistant professor of applied biochemistry in 1979 after two years at the University of California, San Diego where he did postdoctoral research.
