= Líšťany =

Líšťany may refer to places in the Czech Republic:

- Líšťany (Louny District), a municipality and village in the Ústí nad Labem Region
- Líšťany (Plzeň-North District), a municipality and village in the Plzeň Region
