= Territorial matrix =

Tissue surrounding chondrocytes in cartilage

The territorial matrix is the tissue surrounding chondrocytes (cells which produce cartilage) in cartilage. Chondrocytes are inactive cartilage cells, so they don't make cartilage components. The territorial matrix is one of three major regions of the extracellular matrix; it is surrounded by the pericellular matrix and the interterritorial region. It is mostly composed of collagen fibrils, and is hypothesized to protect cartilage cells against large mechanical stress, contributing to the resiliency of the articular cartilage. The territorial matrix plays a large role in the overall load bearing capacity and resilience of the joint structure; fibril matrix acts as a compressive barrier against compressive and shear forces. The territorial matrix is basophilic (attracts basic compounds and dyes due to its anionic/acidic nature), because there is a higher concentration of proteoglycans, so it will color darker when it's colored and viewed under a microscope. In other words, it stains metachromatically (dyes change color upon binding) due to the presence of proteoglycans (compound molecules composed of proteins and sugars).

== Structure ==
The territorial matrix is composed of collagen fibrils and proteoglycans, forming a dense matrix around groups of chondrocytes, distinguishing itself from neighboring zones. It is located between the pericellular and interterritorial matrix. The territorial matrix is smaller in size (5-10 μm) than the interterritorial matrix, but larger than the pericellular matrix.^{,}

The collagen that exists in this region is primarily type II collagen, with some types IX and XI. It is arranged in a finer, more interwoven network than in the interterritorial matrix. Proteoglycans like aggrecan and decorin provide resistance to compressive loads. Several glycoproteins are also present and play roles in the matrix assembly and stabilization. The close packing of the fibrils make the region denser, forming a mechanical barrier around chondrocytes.

== Function ==
This region functions to provide mechanical support for the articular cartilage. It serves primarily as an intermediate protective layer for tissues undergoing continuous mechanical loading. The fibril network distributes these stresses away from the chondrocyte membrane. Proteoglycan aggregates create osmotic swelling pressure that resists compression, while densely woven collagen fibrils confer tensile strength. The territorial matrix is also involved in signal transduction and nutrient exchange within the cartilage.

The cartilage matrix lacks blood vessels, so nutrient and waste transport may only occur through diffusion directly through the extracellular matrix. The territorial matrix serves as a boundary layer, selectively permeable to the molecules necessary for chondrocyte. In result, the structure and composition of the territorial matrix directly influences the metabolism and function of the cells it protects.

The territorial matrix also has an important role in mechanotransduction, the conversion of physical forces into biochemical signals. The mechanical movement of the territorial matrix changes ion concentrations, fluid flow, and strain on fibrils, all leading to various cellular responses like synthesis of matrix components or degradation. Mechanical stresses lead to adaptation and ultimately cartilage homeostasis; proper functioning of these signaling pathways are essential.

== Development and Organization ==
During cartilage development mesenchymal stem cells differentiate into chondrocytes, secreting various extracellular proteins, giving rise to the unique matrix zones. The territorial matrix develops as chondrocytes release collagen and proteoglycans, among other supporting organic molecules. These extracellular proteins form chondrons, a functional unit consisting of chondrocytes, the pericellular matrix, and the territorial matrix in order extending outward. Differences in the concentrations of molecules and fibril organization between the regions lead to clear patterns typical of mature cartilage.

The articular cartilage shows variation across different zones in the extracellular matrix. Superficially, the collagen fibrils run parallel to the surface, resisting shear forces. In the middle zone, the fibrils are arranged randomly, allowing for optimal compressive absorption. The deep zone contains perpendicular fibrils, anchoring cartilage to the bone and transferring load. These gradients allow the territorial matrix to distribute its mechanical properties across zones.

== Clinical Significance ==
In diseases related to the cartilage, the territorial matrix undergoes structural and material changes, leading to degradation of the joints, like in the case of osteoarthritis. Osteoarthritis occurs when the proteoglycans and collagen fibers degrade and become disorganized. Consequently, the decreased mechanical support makes chondrocytes more vulnerable to damage. Matrix-degrading enzymes including matrix metalloproteinases (MMPs) target the region which can accelerate cartilage degradation.

Attempts to restore a functional territorial matrix is a particular area of interest in tissue engineering and cartilage repair, since its structure significantly contributes to optimal mechanical and biochemical behavior. Studies on biomimetic proteoglycans, which mimic the natural existing component of the ECM, and their effect on neighboring cartilage regions have shown promising results for strengthening cartilage with osteoarthritis.

Additionally, biomaterials designed to mimic native composition and mechanical properties of cartilage, especially those with synthetic proteoglycans or collagen, have shown experimental promise. In combination with these structures, the durability of engineering cartilage may be enhanced by regenerating the territorial matrix and could improve integration with native tissue.

== Research Applications ==
The territorial matrix is studied in various fields, such as tissue engineering, regenerative medicine, and biomaterials. Techniques such as immunofluorescence and atomic force microscopy (AFM) are commonly used for visualization. These methods are used to measure the stiffness, elasticity, and composition of the matrix at a nano- and micro-scale resolution. More importantly, information may be gleaned from these visualization methods about various pathologies of cartilage and its components.

In regenerative medicine, territorial matrix reconstruction efforts focus on achieving natural fibril orientation, proteoglycan density, and mechanical strength. These properties are observed and monitored using the above mentioned analytical methods. By replicating the structure of natural cartilage as closely as possible, the bioengineered tissues are more likely to integrate with the native tissues and sustain loading.
