= Chondritis =

Medical condition

Chondritis is inflammation of cartilage.

It takes several forms, osteochondritis, costochondritis, and relapsing polychondritis among them. Costochondritis is notable for feeling like a heart attack.

== See also ==
- Chondropathy
- Chondrolysis
- Perichondritis, commonly involving the outer ear
- Relapsing polychondritis
