= Pseudocyst of the auricle =

Medical condition of the ear

- Other names: Auricular pseudocyst, endochondral pseudocyst, cystic chondromalacia, intracartilaginous auricular seroma cyst, and benign idiopathic cystic chondromalacia.
- Specialty: Dermatology

Pseudocyst of the auricle, also known as auricular pseudocyst, endochondral pseudocyst, cystic chondromalacia, intracartilaginous auricular seroma cyst, and benign idiopathic cystic chondromalacia, is a cutaneous condition characterized by a fluctuant, tense, noninflammatory swelling on the upper half of the ear, known as the auricle or pinna. Pseudocysts of the auricle are nontender, noninflammatory cystic lesions that progress over a 4- to 12-week period, ranging from 1 to 5 cm in diameter. They are usually unilateral, often on the right ear, but can also present bilaterally.

The auricle pseudodocyst can occur independently, but prior trauma is a significant factor in initiating tissue plane separation within cartilage, leading to fluid buildup in the affected area.

Diagnosis is often based on a patient's history, physical examination, and histopathologic analysis. Differential diagnoses include subperichondrial hematoma due to trauma, chondrodermatitis helicis, relapsing polychondritis, and cellulitis. Various therapies, including simple aspiration, corticosteroid injection, and reinforced pressure sutures, are available.

== Signs and symptoms ==
A single lesion on the front part of the ear is usually the initial sign of pseudocyst of the auricle. Pseudocysts of the auricle appear as flesh-colored, nontender, noninflammatory cystic lesions and progress gradually over a 4- to 12-week period. Their diameters range from 1 to 5 cm. Usually, the lesions start off soft and get firmer with time. They are filled with a viscous substance that resembles olive oil and is often straw-yellow in hue. Serous and serosanguinous fluid, however, might be present. The most common appearance of pseudocyst of the auricle is unilateral, usually on the right ear, while reports of bilateral presentations have also been made.

== Causes ==
Pseudocyst of the auricle can happen on its own, but the majority of authors concur that prior trauma is a key initiating factor for the separation of tissue planes inside the cartilage, which is followed by fluid buildup in that area.

== Diagnosis ==
A patient's history and physical examination are frequently used to make a diagnosis. Histopathologic analysis may occasionally be necessary for the confirmation of a diagnosis.

Cyst-like lesions with a fibrous, cartilaginous, and granulation tissue lining devoid of epithelium, coupled with ahyalinizing degeneration of the surrounding cartilage, are typical histopathologic features.

The differential diagnosis consists of subperichondrial hematoma owing to trauma, chondrodermatitis helicis, relapsing polychondritis, and cellulitis.

== Treatment ==
The literature reports a variety of therapies, such as simple aspiration, intralesional corticosteroid injection, and aspiration combined with reinforced pressure sutures or a plaster of paris cast.

More invasive methods such as opening the cavity, draining it, and then obliterating it with curettage, sclerosing agent, and pressure dressing; open deroofing, which entails removing the anterior cartilaginous leaflet of the pseudocyst and realigning the skin flap overlying it, have also been suggested. On the other hand, the risk of perichondritis aggravated by the development of a cauliflower deformity or floppy ear is associated with invasive treatment techniques, and recurrences may occur afterward.

== See also ==
- Verrucous cyst
- Cutaneous columnar cyst
