= Chondropathy =

- Specialty: Orthopedics

Chondropathy refers to a disease of the cartilage. It is frequently divided into 5 grades, with 0-2 defined as normal and 3-4 defined as diseased.

== Some common diseases affecting/involving the cartilage ==
- Achondroplasia: Reduced proliferation of chondrocytes in the epiphyseal plate of long bones during infancy and childhood, resulting in dwarfism.
- Cartilage tumors
- Costochondritis: Inflammation of cartilage in the ribs, causing chest pain.
- Osteoarthritis: The cartilage covering bones (articular cartilage) is thinned, eventually completely worn out, resulting in a "bone against bone" joint, resulting in pain and reduced mobility. Osteoarthritis is very common, affects the joints exposed to high stress and is therefore considered the result of "wear and tear" rather than a true disease. It is treated by Arthroplasty, the replacement of the joint by a synthetic joint made of titanium and teflon. Chondroitin sulfate, a monomer of the polysaccharide portion of proteoglycan, has been shown to reduce the symptoms of osteoarthritis, possibly by increasing the synthesis of the extracellular matrix.
- Spinal disc herniation: Asymmetrical compression of an intervertebral disc ruptures the sac-like disc, causing a herniation of its soft content. The hernia compresses the adjacent nerves and causes back pain.
- Relapsing polychondritis: a destruction, probably autoimmune, of cartilage, especially of the nose and ears, causing disfiguration. Death occurs by suffocation as the larynx loses its rigidity and collapses.

== Repairing articular cartilage damage ==
Though articular cartilage damage is not life-threatening, it does strongly affect the quality of life. Articular cartilage damage is often the cause of severe pain, swellings, strong barriers to mobility and severe restrictions to the patient's activities. Over the last decades, however, surgeons and biotech ventures have elaborated promising procedures that contribute to articular cartilage repair. However, these procedures do not treat osteoarthritis.
