= Isogenous =

Isogenous may refer to:

- Of abelian varieties, the property of being linked by an isogeny
- An isogenous group of cells in medicine

== See also ==
- Isogenic (disambiguation)
