= Anton von Jaksch =

Czech-Austrian internist (1810–1887)

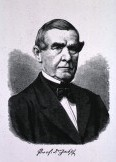
Anton von Jaksch

Anton Ritter Jaksch von Wartenhorst (10 April 1810 – 2 September 1887) was a Czech-Austrian medical doctor. He was the father of internist Rudolf von Jaksch (1855–1947).

== Life ==
He was born on 10 April 1810 in Stráž pod Ralskem, Bohemia, Austrian Empire. He studied medicine at the University of Prague under Julius Vincenz von Krombholz, and at the University of Vienna, where he had as instructors Joseph Škoda, Jakob Kolletschka and Carl von Rokitansky. He earned his doctorate in 1835, afterwards working as an assistant at the second medical clinic in Prague.

From 1842 to 1846, he was a lecturer at the newly established thoracic department at Prague, and in 1846, he became director of the second medical clinic. In 1849, he was appointed rector of the university. From 1850 to 1881, he was in charge of the first medical clinic.

He died on 2 September 1887 in Luhov.

== Selected publications ==
- Abhandlung über das perforirende Magengeschwür in diagnostischer und therapeutischer Hinsicht, 1844.
- Ueber die spontane Heilung der Krankheiten der Herzklappen (On the spontaneous cure of diseases of the heart valves).
- Bericht über Duchenne's de Boulogne Faradisation localisée und Claude Bernard nach einem längeren Aufenthalte in Paris 1852 (Report on Duchenne de Boulogne's localized faradisation and on Claude Bernard according to a lengthy stay in Paris in 1852), 1860.
- Über Blutvergiftung durch Hautresorption (About blood poisoning through skin absorption), 1844.
- Einige Mitt. über die Wichtigkeit des Gesichts- und Tastsinnes bei Erforschung der Krankheiten der Respirationsorgane, 1847.
- Klinische Vorträge über die Lehre von der Syphilis innerer Organe (Clinical lectures on the doctrine of syphilis of internal organs), 1864.
