= Bronchogenic cyst =

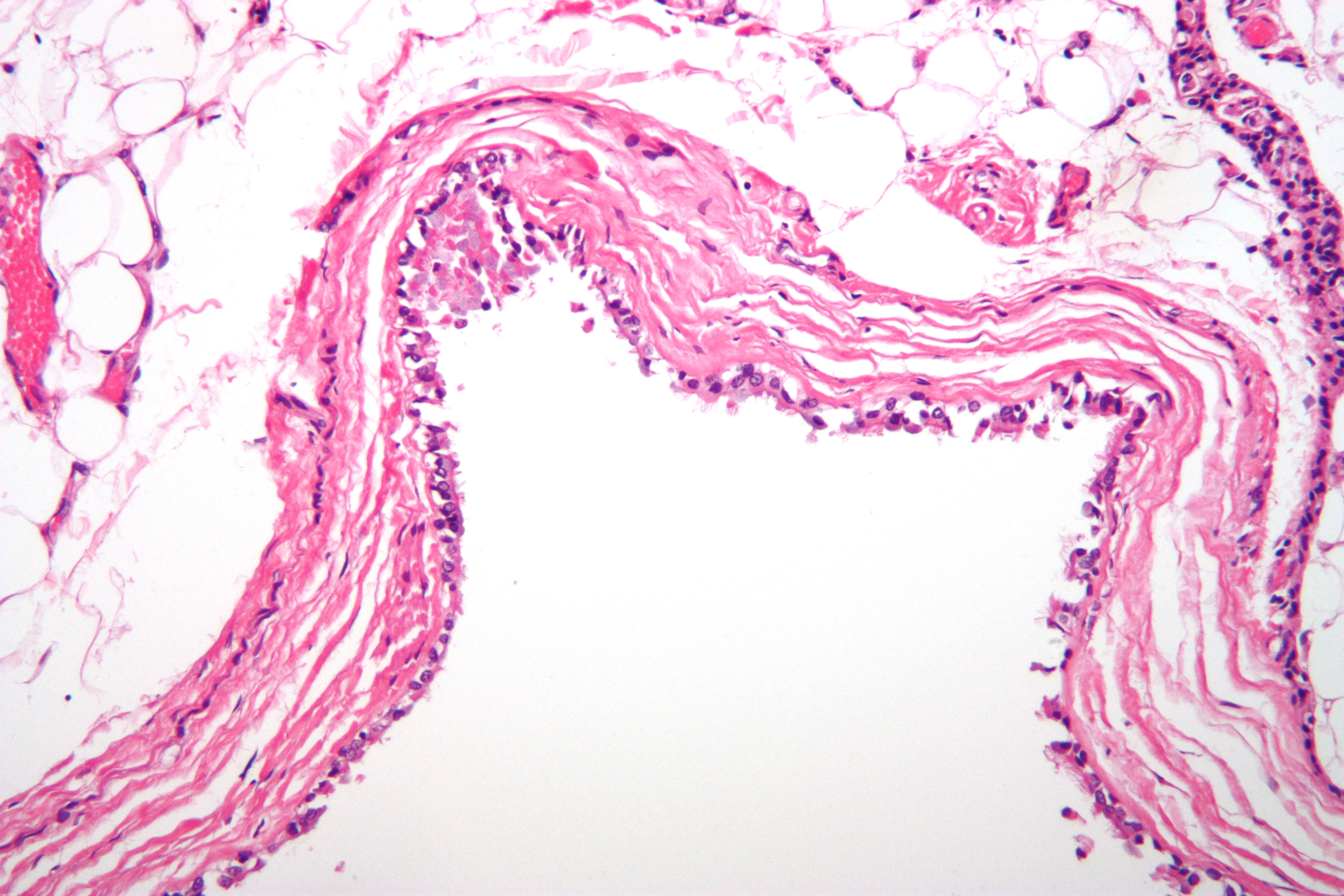
- Micrograph of a mediastinal bronchogenic cyst – H&E stain

Bronchogenic cysts are small, solitary cysts or sinuses, most typically located in the region of the suprasternal notch or behind the manubrium.

== Clinical features ==
These cysts are mostly found in young adults and are rare in infancy. The usual symptoms result from compression by the cyst, e.g., difficulty breathing or swallowing, cough, and chest pain. Malignant degeneration has been reported in these cysts on rare occasions. Bronchogenic cysts are usually found in the middle mediastinum. Chest x-rays show a smooth density just before the trachea or main stem bronchi at the carinal level. When the cyst communicates with the tracheobronchial tree, the air-fluid level may be seen within the cyst. CT scanning is useful in localizing these cysts.

== Pathology ==
Bronchogenic cysts are formed in the 6th week of gestation from an abnormal budding of the tracheal diverticulum. They are lined by respiratory type (ciliated) epithelium, which is characterized by cilia. Histologically these are also composed of cartilage, smooth muscle, fibrous tissue and mucous glands. These cysts originate from the ventral foregut that forms the respiratory system. These cysts are located close to the trachea or main stem bronchi. Rarely there is communication of the cyst with the tracheobronchial tree.

== Treatment ==
- Excision provides definitive diagnosis and cure.
- Biopsy provides a definitive diagnosis with less surgical risk.
- Observation provides minimal risk from the intervention, but carries some risk of bleeding or infection of the cyst at a later time, making excision more difficult if it occurs.

== Additional images ==
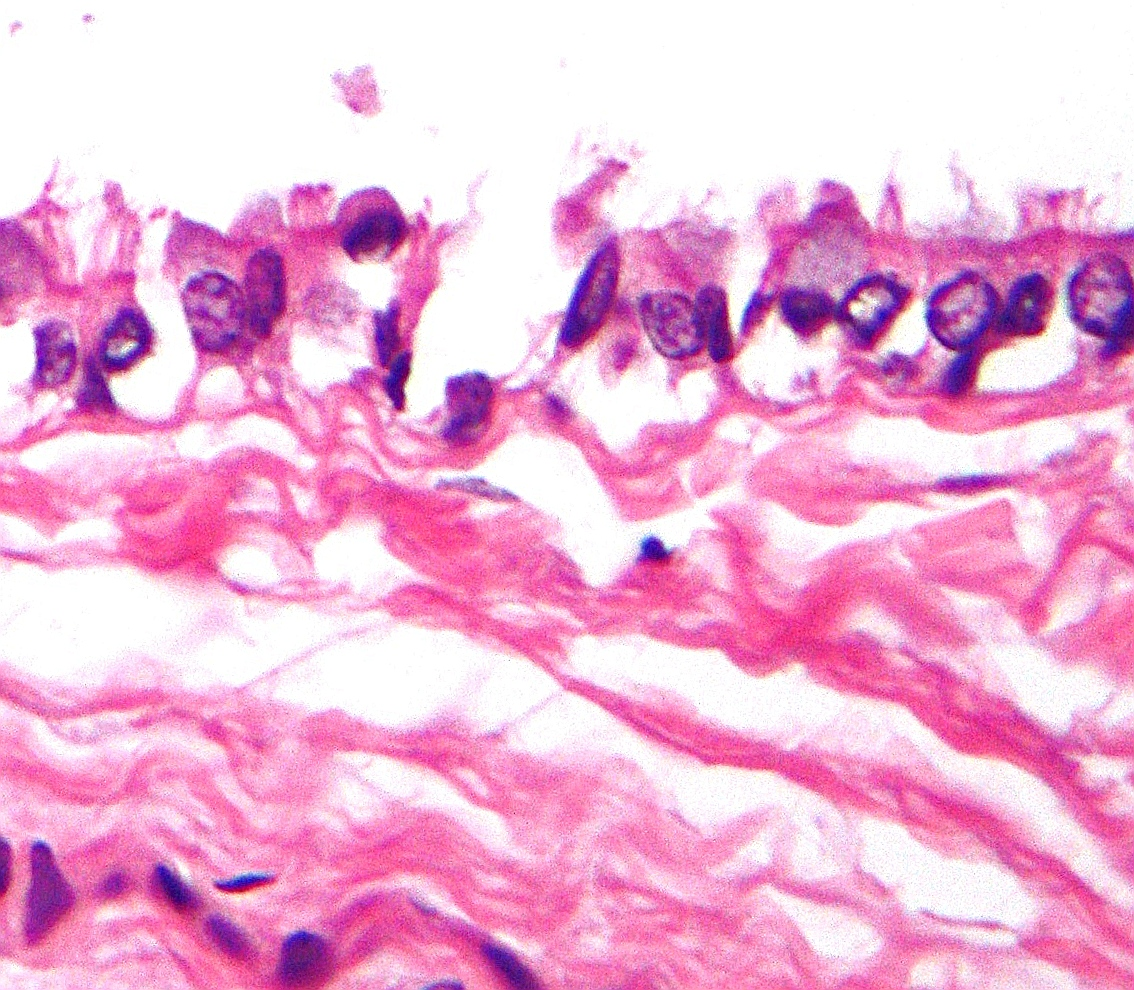
A very high magnification light micrograph shows a cilia of a bronchogenic cyst. H&E stain.

== See also ==
- Cutaneous columnar cyst
- List of cutaneous conditions
