= Cutaneous ciliated cyst =

- Specialty: Dermatology

Cutaneous ciliated cysts are a cutaneous condition characterized by solitary cysts located on the legs of females. They are usually asymptomatic. The exact causes is unknown but they are believed to be made of ectopic Mullerian residue or ciliated eccrine gland metaplasia.

== Signs and symptoms ==
Cutaneous ciliated cysts are asymptomatic. They are usually found on the lower extremities. Cutaneous ciliated cysts range from 1 to 4 cm in size and are typically soft, variable, nonhyperemic, and painless masses.

== Causes ==
Although the exact cause is unknown, two potential causes exist. The first is that they are an ectopic Müllerian residue because, after puberty, they grow with hormonal stimulus and mimic the epithelium protecting a girl's fallopian tubes. The second hypothesis states that they represent ciliated eccrine gland metaplasia.

== Diagnosis ==
Under light microscopy, the cysts appear to be uniloculated and have ciliated cuboidal to columnar epithelium around them that lacks mucous cells. This epithelium resembles the fallopian tube epithelium in morphology. Epithelial membrane antigen, cytokeratin, progesterone receptor, and estrogen receptor immunohistochemical staining are all positive, however carcinoembryonic antigen was negative.

== Treatment ==
The recommended course of treatment for cutaneous ciliated cysts is surgical excision under local anesthesia.

== See also ==
- Cutaneous columnar cyst
- Skin lesion
