= Median raphe cyst =

- Specialty: Dermatology

Median raphe cysts are a cutaneous condition of the penis due to developmental defects near the glans.

== See also ==
- Cutaneous columnar cyst
- List of cutaneous conditions
