= Isogenous group =

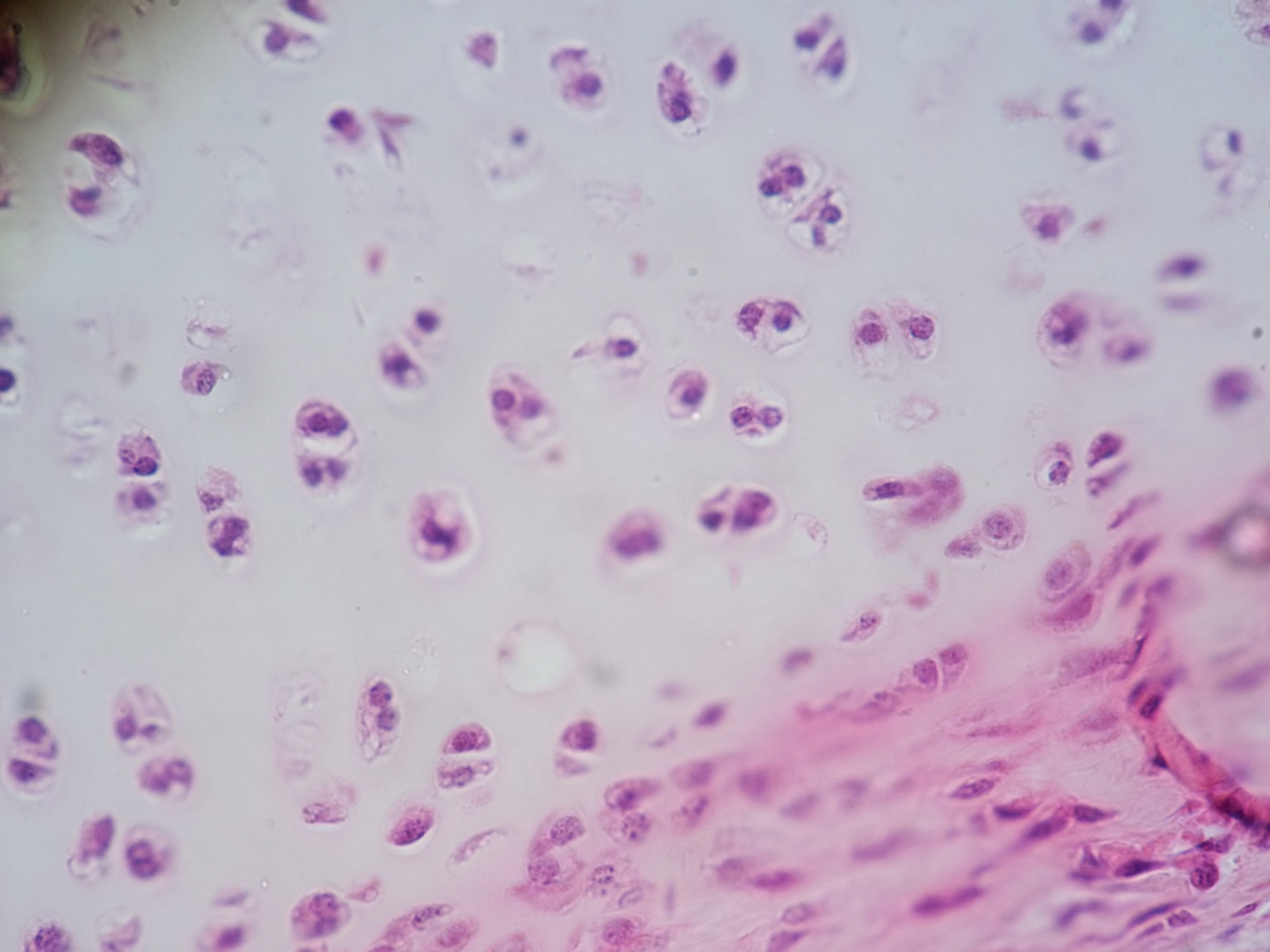
Micrograph of hyaline cartilage containing isogenous groups.

An isogenous group (lat. "equal origin") is a cluster of up to eight chondrocytes found in hyaline and elastic cartilage.

== Formation ==
Chondrocytes develop in the embryo from mesenchymal progenitor cells through a process known as chondrogenesis. A chondrocyte can then undergo mitosis to form an isogenous group within its lacuna.

== Function ==
Isogenous groups differentiate into individual chondrocytes where they continue to produce and deposit extracellular matrix (ECM), lengthening the cartilage and increasing its diameter. This is termed interstitial growth and is one of only two ways cartilage can grow.

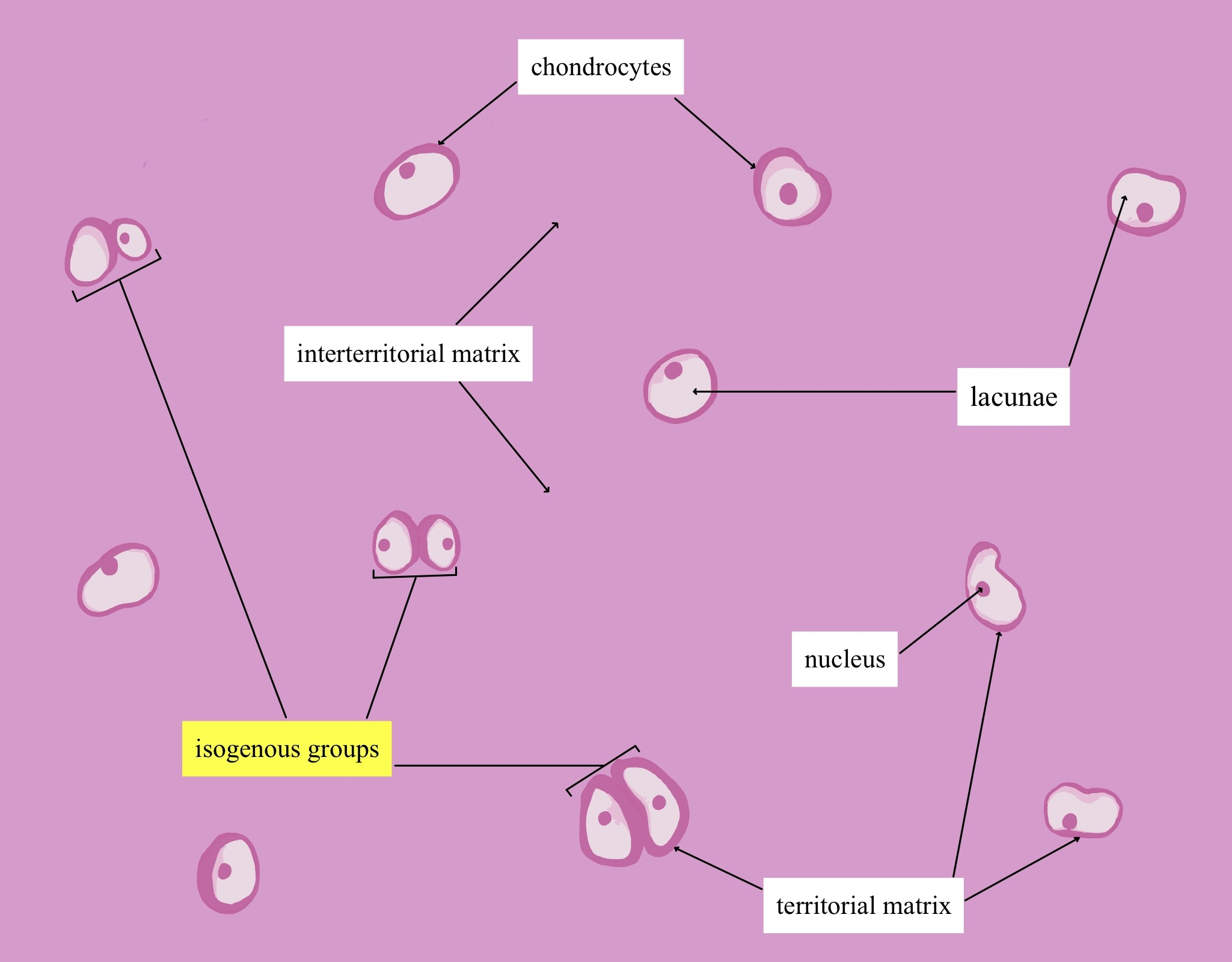
Cartoon representation of hyaline cartilage with isogenous groups.

== See also ==
- Endochondral ossification
- Hyaline
