= Chondrodermatitis nodularis chronica helicis =

- Other names: Chondrodermatitis nodularis helicis
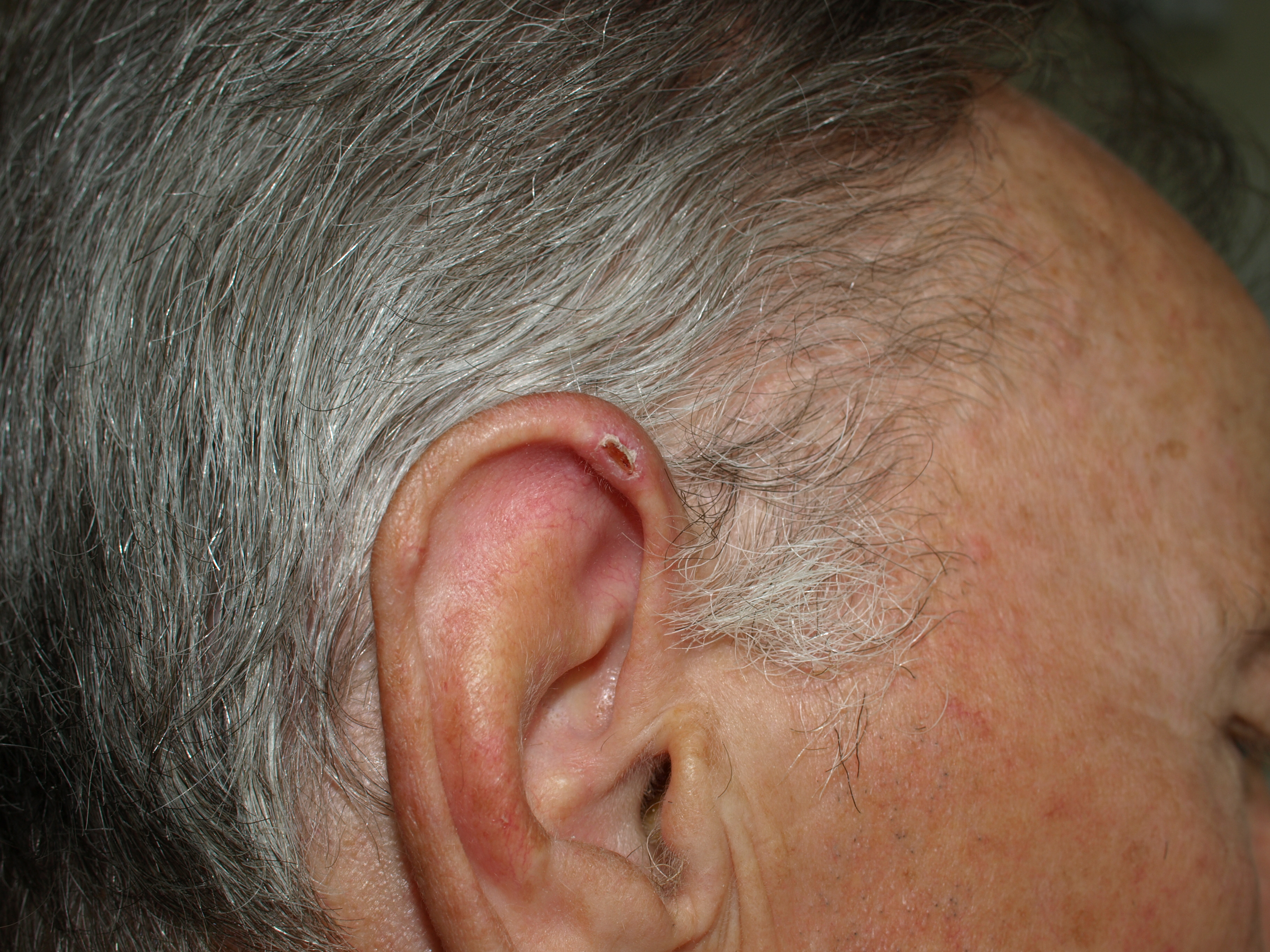
- Chondrodermatitis helicis nodularis in a 67-year-old man
- Specialty: Dermatology

Chondrodermatitis nodularis chronica helicis (CNCH) is a small, nodular, tender, chronic inflammatory lesion occurring on the helix of the ear, most often in men. it often presents as a benign painful erythematous nodule fixed to the cartilage of the helix or antihelix of the external ear. Although the exact cause of the condition is unknown, it has been linked to head pressure on the ear while sleeping. Treatment options include the use of pressure-relieving devices or, in cases where that is not an option, surgery.

== Causes ==
The cause of CNCH is unknown. Nonetheless, a number of variables are thought to be involved in the development of CNCH, with the onset being associated with microtrauma, prolonged high pressure, or dermal ischemia.

=== Risk factors ===
Elastic tissue loss, vascular and connective tissue degradation, and skin and cartilage thinning are all brought on by aging. The onset of CNCH symptoms may be related to the cartilage's increased susceptibility to pressure damage as it ages and loses some of its flexibility. Additionally, older adults typically move less while they sleep, which puts even more pressure on the ear.

== Epidemiology ==
Chondrodermatitis nodularis chronica helicis is relatively rare, but it prefers fair-skinned men between the ages of 40 and 80. Despite the fact that women are affected by CNCH, the reported male to female ratio is 10 to 1. CNCH usually affects one side of the body, although reports of bilateral lesions have indicated an incidence of 3% to 7%. After developing CNCH on the contralateral ear, patients who switch their sleeping side typically develop bilateral lesions. Furthermore, CNCH can affect people of any age; cases involving children and teenagers have been documented.

== See also ==
- List of cutaneous conditions
