= Chondronectin =

Protein

Chondronectin is a high molecular weight collagen matrix protein (~180 kDa), or also known as a glycoprotein, and is most commonly found in human synovial fluid. It is mainly responsible for binding chondrocytes and collagen II substrates together in the extracellular matrix (ECM). Chondronectin is characterized as a trimeric protein, that is linked with disulfide bonds. It also has been noted to appear compact and globular in nature.

Chondronectin is responsible for helping anchor chondrocytes, bearing mechanical forces and even maintaining homeostasis on a physiological level.

Chondronectin works within tissue, where it joins other proteins to build a strong but flexible framework. This structure helps keep joints stable during movement and repeated pressure. Without adhesive matrix proteins like chondronectin, cartilage tissue would have a harder time handling everyday mechanical stress. Chondronectin acts as a strong binding protein inside the body's joints. It helps attach important cartilage cells directly to tough collagen fibers. These cells main responsibility is maintaining healthy cartilage tissue. This protein helps the surrounding tissue structure stay firm and stable while keeping the cartilage properly organized. Without this important connection, the framework of the joins could gradually lose stability.

The protein has a three part molecular shape that helps keep it structurally stable. It remains strong while interacting with nearby matrix tissues and surrounding support components. This specialized structure helps cartilage handle repeated pressure and constant daily use. It also contributes to protecting joint tissue in areas that experience regular physiological wear. Chondronectin helps build the framework of joint tissue. Scientists have examined joint fluid during cartilage breakdown. Despite its small size, it still helps cells stick to surrounding tissue, keeping the overall system health and in balance.

Chondronectin
Identifiers
Aliases	Chondronectin
Protein Type	Glycoprotein
Molecular Weight	~180 kDa
Molecular form	Trimeric
External Database IDs	OMIN: 118670 MONDO:0007323
Primary Location	Human synovial fluid; cartilage extracellular matrix
Main Function	Chondrocyte adhesion to collagen II
Structural Description	Compact and globular
Tissue Association	Articular cartilage
Genes Associated	NA
Related Disorders	NA

== Function ==
The main purpose of chondronectin is to allow chondrocytes and collagen II substrates to bond together. When bound, if forms a complex structure called an extracellular scaffold, which helps support the surrounding cells because of bioactive molecule diversity, which allows for chondrocytes to be anchored, mechanical forces to be bared, and maintaining physiological homeostasis.

In order for chondronectin to be able to assist in binding within this complex as efficiently as possible, they must interact with a cartilage proteoglycan monomer. If there is a inhibitor that prevents synthesis of endogenous proteoglycans, along with beta-xylosides, it fully prevents chondrocytes from attaching via chondronectins.

When cartilage cells attach chondronectin help keep the cells positioned close to important collagen and proteoglycan materials within the extracellular matrix. This allows the cells to support the framework by maintaining surrounding cartilage components. Without attachment, chondrocytes become less effective at preserving the tissue around them.

Chondronectin keeps the cartilage framework strong enough to handle daily joint pressure. It helps cartilage deal with the stress caused by regular movement and compression. Since joints face constant wear, cell bonds must stay stable to help prevent tissue damage. This protein plays a key role in keeping cartilage durable and properly supported.

Studies indicate that weak adhesive interaction inside cartilage matrix can gradually reduce the integrity to cartilage. For this reason, chondronectin is recognized as a supportive factor in maintaining extracellular matrix function and normal cartilage homeostasis.

== Structure of protein, and location ==
Chondronectin has a molecular weight of 180,000 Daltons (~180 kDa), and had disulfide bonds that are linked to 75 kilodalton subunits. It is found most commonly in human cartilage, but in human synovial fluid as well, and vitreous fluid, but is in higher concentrations within plasma rather than synovial fluid. It is found present in plasma at a concentration of 20 micrograms/mL.

Anatomical depiction of eye, where vitreous humor is found.

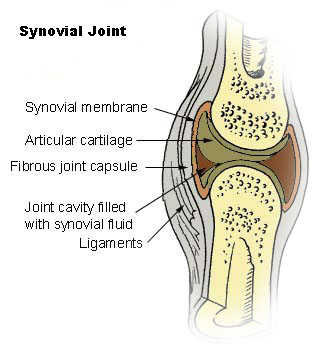
Depiction of a synovial joint, where synovial fluid is located.

When chondronectin is in the presence of guanidium chloride and cysteine, it has a subunit molecular weight of 55,540 +/- 800 Daltons.

They have also been noted to be similar in structure and function to fibronectin proteins, but they interact with different types of proteins and molecules in the matrix.

Chondronectin has a three-part shape. This keeps the protein steady while it interacts with many nearby molecules. Proteins that help link cells must remain strong in order to function properly. They need to stay connected without breaking apart. Strong chemical bonds help keep this structure together during physical stress.

Chondronectin is found in joint fluid, eye fluid, and blood. These tissues need enough support and cushioning to function well. Because these areas are exposed to constant movement and fluid changes, the protein must remain strong and stable. It helps tissues stay connected even when fluid moves around them. Finding chondronectin in several places shows that it helps support multiple tissues rather than only one area.

== History ==
Was first partially isolated and purified from a serum that contained chondrocytes from chick embryos in 1981 by scientists/researchers A. Tyl Hewitt, Hugh H. Varner, Michael H. Silver, Waltraud Dessau, Charlotte M. Wilkes, and George R. Martin. This group would later go on in the study and deem this attachment factor that they found to be chondronectin.^{[7]} It was then found in human fetal cartilage and human serum.

Early scientists focused on proving that chondronectin was its own separate protein. They needed to show that it was not just another molecule that had already been identified. By the 1980s, newer studies gave researchers more evidence about its role in supporting cartilage and surrounding cells. Finding it in many biological samples also showed that it exists in different species. It is not limited to only one type of tissue.

In 1987, chondronectin was isolated from articular cartilage from a canine by researchers Nancy Burton-Wurster, Valerie J. Horn, and George Lust.

It was then reported to be in human synovial fluid in a 1988 study done by Steven Carsons and Valerie J. Horn. How they did this was by using a monoclonal antibody that was used in a linked immunosorbent assay (ELISA), along with a Western blot assay to observe the protein in synovial fluid.

Scientist found chondronectin in both joint fluid and cartilage. This find made researchers wonder if it helps keep joints healthy. In the past, experts used it as a simple tool to help cells stick to a surface. Now they see it as a vital part of connective tissue research.

== Additional facts ==
- On Malacards, it has an information score of 7/100.
- There are currently no known genes or related disorders related to chondronectins.
- There are no current therapeutics, variations, expressions, pathways, GO terms or genetic tests for chondronectins currently.
- Chondronectin has been described as a trimeric glycoprotein with compact globular properties.
- The protein has most commonly been detected in cartilage related fluids such as synovial fluid and plasma.
- Chondronectin functions primarily as an attachment factor between chondrocytes and collagen based matrix materials. Most currently available information on chondronectin comes from isolation and characterization studies completed during the 1980s.

== Biological significance ==
Chondronectin helps keep joint tissue strong and properly supported. By helping cells attach to the surrounding framework, it supports cartilage structure, and these cells produce and repair the materials that cushion bones. To function properly, they must stay attached to collagen. This stable bond helps cartilage handle daily pressure and movement, while strong connections also help prevent the tissue from gradually breaking down over time. Joints experience less wear when these cells remain connected.

Articular cartilage takes on heavy pressure every day. Special proteins help by holding the cells and tissue together, which kepp the whole structure from gradually becoming weak over time. Chondronectin is one protein that perfroms this supportive role. It helps keep the cells and fibers in the proper place. This organized layout helps the surrounding area remain balanced and also helps joints handle normal wear over time.

Cartilage cells must stay attached to their base in order to survive. This bond helps tissues handle stress and remain durable over time. A protein called chondronectin helps support this important process. It is not found in the highest amounts within the joint, but its adhesive role still helps maintain normal cartilage movement and support.

== Related proteins ==
- Fibronectin
  - The second most abundant ECM molecule, this molecule also promotes homeostasis and maintaining the structure of the collagen matrix, as well as adhesion of cells to the matrix, and is created by hepatocytes. Some key differences include that fibronectin does not need a cartilage proteoglycan monomer to function efficiently, and is found at concentrations ten times higher than chondronectin in plasma. Also, instead of interacting with chondrocytes and type II collagen, fibronectins interact with other cells with types I and III collagen. Another difference is that fibronectin binds to the collagen directly before a cell can interact with the ECM.
- Laminin
  - These glycoproteins also have a large molecular weight and are also trimeric in structure, like chondronectins. although they have 14 different combinations of trimer structures. Laminins facilitate the attachment of basement membranes in the human body, which are extracellular matrices that hold tissues and cells together. Laminins help to regulate cell activity, and have eleven distinct forms.
- Type II collagen
  - A structural protein in the collagen matrix, type II collagen is much more abundant in the matrix than chondronectins, as this protein makes up 90-95% of the matrix. It is also found in the vitreous humor, and other areas of hyaline cartilage as well. Some key differences are that type II collagen is a structural protein that helps to provide structure and strength to the matrix, while chondronectins only facilitates binding of type II collagen to chondrocytes.
- Chondrocytes
  - Cells that produce the cartilage matrix and maintain the extracellular matrix. Help to increase flexibility in cartilage, and help to maintain homeostasis in articular cartilage. Chondrocytes are specialized cells, while chondronectins are proteins that are produced by chondrocytes to mediate attachment of chondrocytes to type II collagen.
- Chondroitin Sulfate Proteoglycans (CSPGs)
  - Components of the ECM that contain glycosaminoglycan (GAG) side chains, and a protein core. These components help with binding of cells and receptors, as well as cellular growth. Both CSPGs and chondronectins are part of the ECM, but they vary in their roles, as CSPGs focus more on axonal growth and chondronectins focus on adhesion.
