= Isogenic =

Isogenic may refer to:

- Zygosity
- Isogenic human disease models

== See also ==
- Isogenous (disambiguation)
