= Cutaneous columnar cyst =

- Specialty: Dermatology

Cutaneous columnar cysts are a cutaneous condition, a group of different cysts lined by columnar epithelium. Types of cysts included in this group are:

- Bronchogenic cyst
- Branchial cyst
- Thyroglossal duct cyst
- Cutaneous ciliated cyst
- Median raphe cyst

== See also ==
- Pseudocyst of the auricle
- List of cutaneous conditions
