= Rudolf von Jaksch =

Austrian-Czech internist (1855–1947)

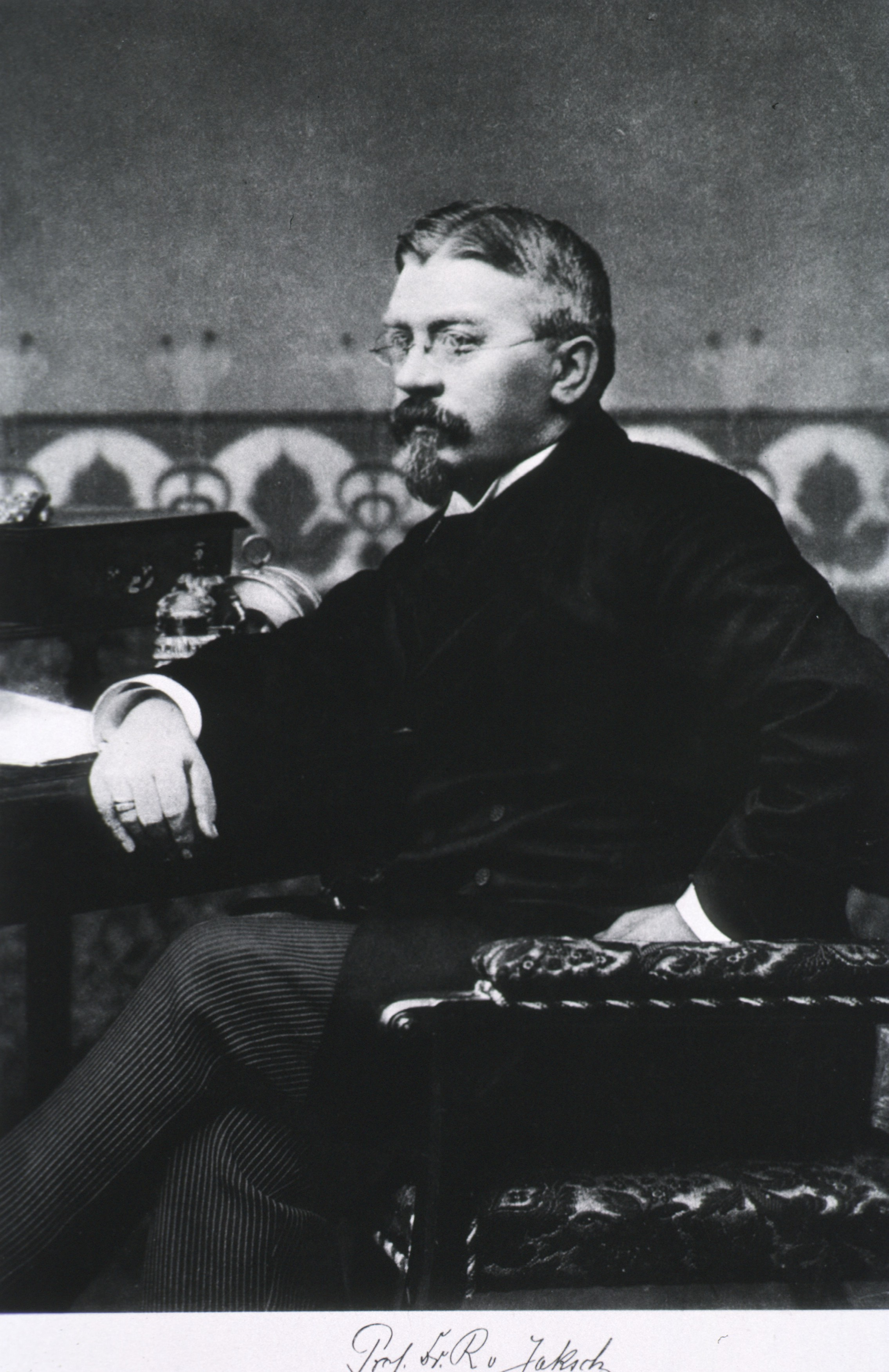
- Rudolf von Jaksch
- Born: 16 July 1855; Prague, Kingdom of Bohemia, Austrian Empire
- Died: 8 January 1947 (aged 91); Hracholusky, Czechoslovakia
- Education: University of Prague; University of Strasbourg
- Known for: Jaksch’s anaemia
- Scientific career
- Fields: internal medicine, pediatrics
- Workplaces: University of Graz; University of Prague

Rudolf von Jaksch, also Rudolf Jaksch von Wartenhorst (16 July 1855 – 8 January 1947), was an Austrian-Czech internist. He was the son of physician Anton von Jaksch (1810–1887). In 1889 he described the disease anaemia leucaemica infantum, a chronic anemic disease that affects children under three years of age, which was named "Jaksch's anemia" for him.

== Life ==
He studied medicine at the universities of Prague and Strasbourg, earning his doctorate at Prague in 1878. Following graduation he remained in Prague as an assistant to pathologist Edwin Klebs. From 1879 to 1881 he worked with his father, and in 1881–1882 was an assistant to Alfred Pribram. In 1882 he moved to Vienna, where he was assistant to Hermann Nothnagel. The following year he received his habilitation in internal medicine.

In 1887 he was appointed professor of pediatrics at the University of Graz, later becoming a professor of internal medicine and director of the second internal clinic at Karl-Ferdinands-Universität (German University) in Prague. Here, he was instrumental in the construction of a modern clinic that first opened in 1899. He worked in Prague until his retirement in 1925.

He was a prolific author, one of his better efforts being Klinische Diagnostik innerer Krankheiten (1882), a work that was published over several editions and later translated into English as Clinical diagnosis : the bacteriological, chemical, and microscopical evidence of disease.

On his initiative he started with the construction of a new, much more modern and hygienic designed clinic that was opened in 1899. Jaksch was awarded in 1899 for this construction of his permanent bathrooms at the nursing exhibition in Berlin. He was widely honored and awarded, and was included as a member of the Leopoldin-Karolin, the German Academy of Natural Scientists in Halle and the medical surgical academy in Perugia.

In 1882 von Jaksch married Adele von Haerdtl (1867−1944) in Vienna. They had one son and three daughters. He had one brother named August Jaksch von Wartenhorst (1859–1939).

== Discoveries ==
In urine Jaksch discovered acetoacetic acid, a melanin probe and manganese toxicosis. He also discovered new diseases such as Von Jaksch's disease (he himself named it anemia pseudoleukaemica infantum). In 1923 he was the first one who discovered the autoimmune disease relapsing polychondritis, that he himself named polychondropathia.
