= Líšťany (Louny District) =

- Municipality
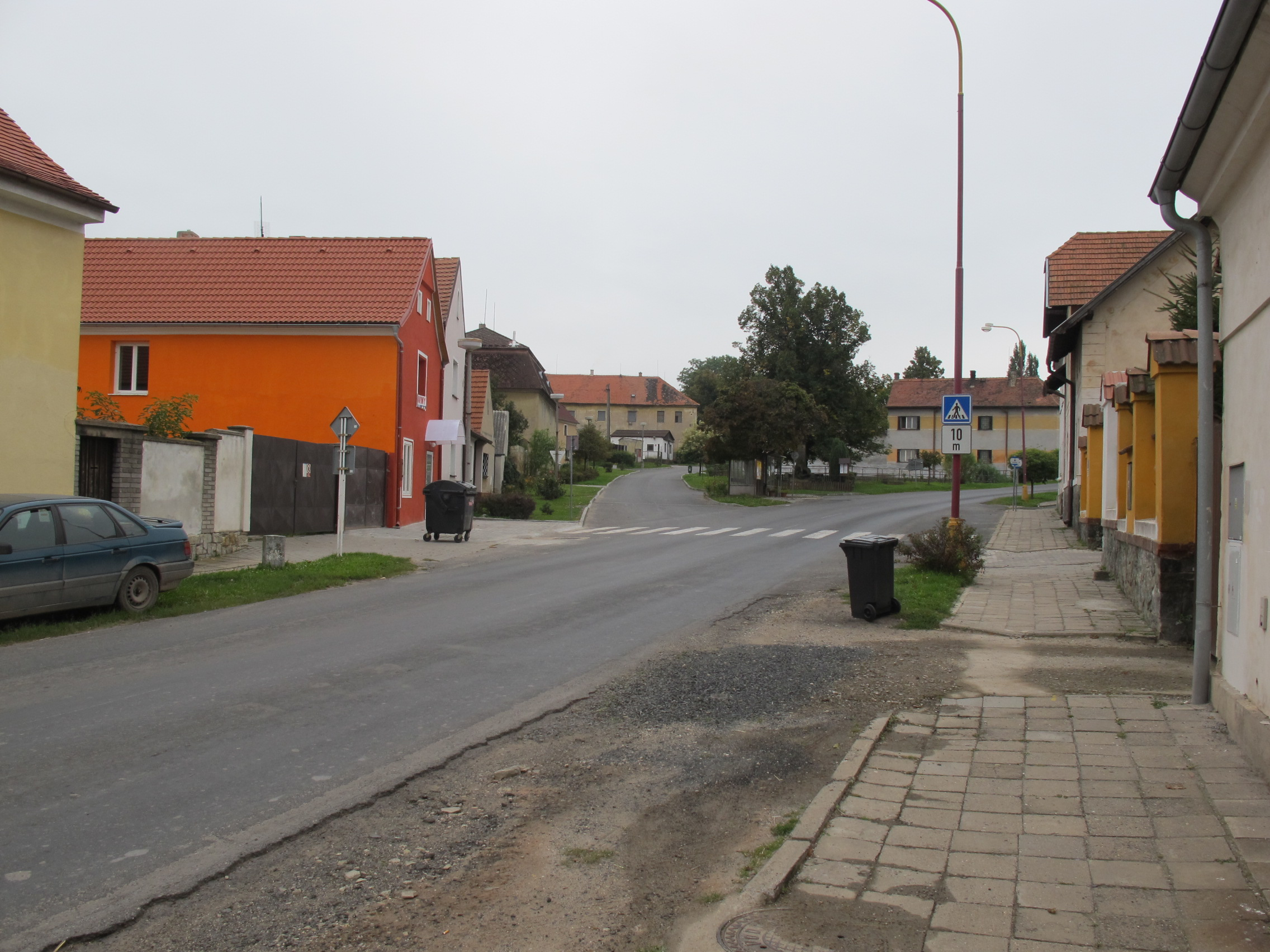
- Centre of Líšťany

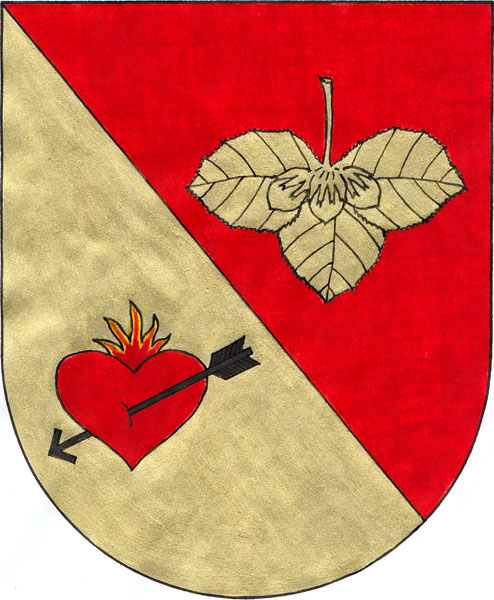
- Flag Coat of arms

- Location in the Czech Republic
- Coordinates: 50°18′45″N 13°48′0″E
- Country: Czech Republic
- Region: Ústí nad Labem
- District: Louny
- First mentioned: 1346

Area
  - Total: 6.03 km^{2} (2.33 sq mi)
- Elevation: 299 m (981 ft)

Population (2026-01-01)
  - Total: 467
  - Density: 77.4/km^{2} (201/sq mi)
- Time zone: UTC+1 (CET)
  - Summer (DST): UTC+2 (CEST)
- Postal code: 440 01
- Website: www.obec-listany.cz

Líšťany is a municipality and village in Louny District in the Ústí nad Labem Region of the Czech Republic. It has about 500 inhabitants.

Líšťany lies approximately 5 kilometres (3 mi) south of Louny, 43 km (27 mi) south-west of Ústí nad Labem, and 52 km (32 mi) north-west of Prague.

== Demographics ==
Historical population
Year	Pop.	±%
1869	630	—
1880	762	+21.0%
1890	852	+11.8%
1900	934	+9.6%
1910	966	+3.4%
1921	1,019	+5.5%
1930	967	−5.1%
1950	679	−29.8%
1961	631	−7.1%
1970	550	−12.8%
1980	510	−7.3%
1991	379	−25.7%
2001	402	+6.1%
2011	447	+11.2%
2021	457	+2.2%
Source: Censuses
