= Relapsing polychondritis =

- Other names: Atrophic polychondritis, systemic chondromalacia, chronic atrophic polychondritis, Meyenburg-Altherr-Uehlinger syndrome, generalized chondromalacia
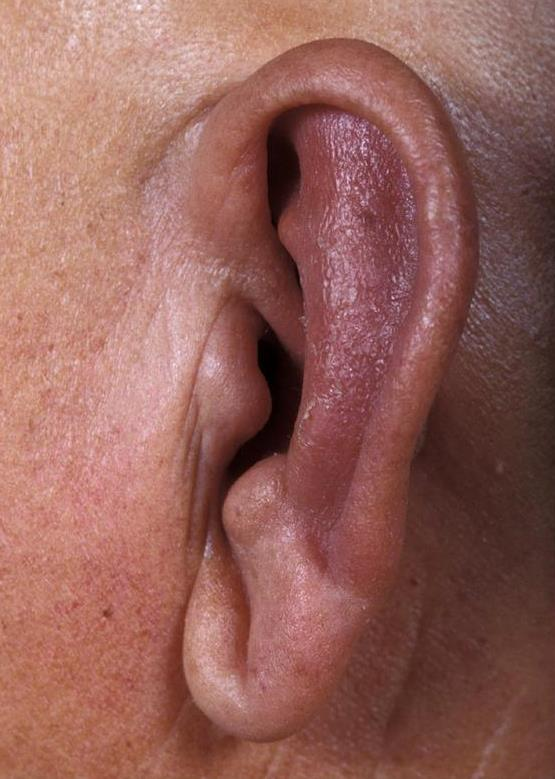
- Ear inflammation with sparing of the ear lobe in a person with relapsing polychondritis
- Specialty: Rheumatology, Immunology

Relapsing polychondritis is a systemic disease characterized by repeated episodes of inflammation and in some cases deterioration of cartilage. The disease can be life-threatening if the respiratory tract, heart valves, or blood vessels are affected. The exact mechanism is poorly understood.

The diagnosis is based on the symptoms and supported by investigations such as blood tests and sometimes other investigations. Treatment may involve symptomatic treatment with painkillers or anti-inflammatory medications, and more severe cases may require suppression of the immune system.

== Signs and symptoms ==
Though any cartilage in the body may be affected in people with relapsing polychondritis, in many cases, the disease affects several areas while sparing others. The disease may exhibit variable signs and symptoms, resulting in a challenging diagnosis that can lead to delayed recognition for several months, years, or even decades.

=== Associated diseases ===
Several other overlapping diseases associated with RP should also be considered. Approximately one-third of people with RP might be associated with other autoimmune diseases, vasculitides, and hematologic disorders. Systemic vasculitis is the most common association with RP, followed by rheumatoid arthritis and systemic lupus erythematosus. The following table displays the main diseases associated with RP.

Class of disease	Specific type of disease
Vasculitides	Granulomatosis with polyangiitis, eosinophilic granulomatosis with polyangiitis, polyarteritis nodosa, Behçet's disease, Takayasu's arteritis, leukocytoclastic vasculitis, temporal arteritis and systemic vasculitis.
Autoimmune diseases	Systemic lupus erythematosus, systemic scleroderma, mixed connective tissue disease, autoimmune thyroiditis, Sjögren's syndrome, dermatomyositis, antiphospholipid syndrome, autoimmune hemolytic anemia, Hashimoto's thyroiditis.
Other Rheumatologic diseases	Rheumatoid arthritis, spondyloarthropathy, reactive arthritis, polymyalgia rheumatica.
Hematologic disorders	Myelodysplasia, myeloproliferative neoplasm.
Dermatologic diseases	Psoriasis, atopic dermatitis, lichen ruber planus, vitiligo.
Autoinflammatory diseases	Familial Mediterranean fever.
Others	Primary biliary cirrhosis, ulcerative colitis, Crohn's disease, diabetes mellitus, pulmonary fibrosis.

=== Cartilage inflammation ===
Cartilage inflammation (technically known as chondritis) that is relapsing is very characteristic of the disease. These recurrent episodes of inflammation over the course of the disease may result in breakdown and loss of cartilage. The signs and symptoms of cartilage inflammation in various parts of the body will be described first.

==== Ear ====
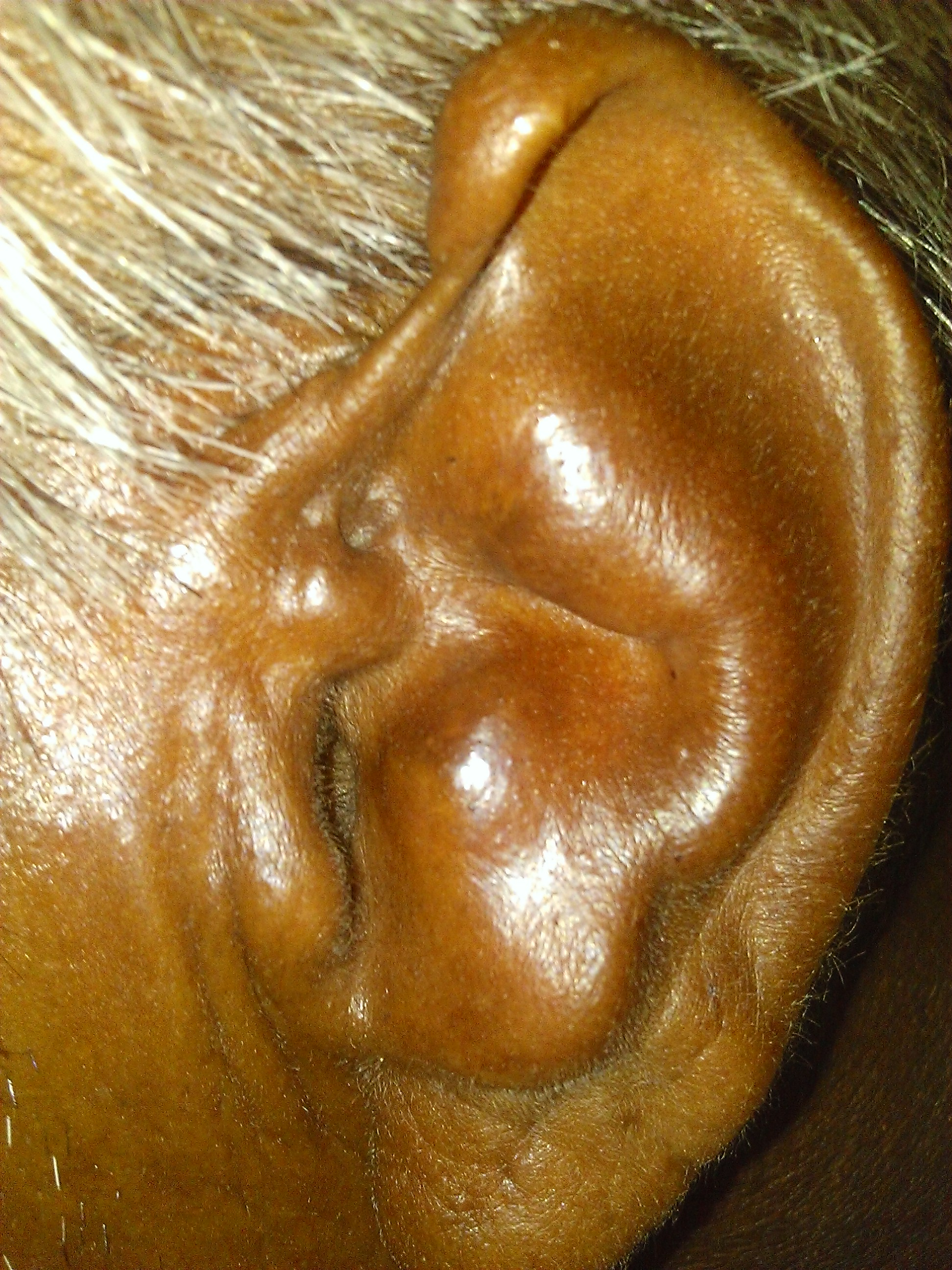
A cauliflower ear deformity

Inflammation of the cartilage of the ear is a specific symptom of the disease and affects most people. It is present in about 20% of persons with RP at presentation and in 90% at some point. Both ears are often affected, but the inflammation may alternate between either ear during a relapse. It is characteristic for the entire outer part of the ear except the earlobe to be swollen, red, or less often purplish, warm, and painful to light touch.

The inflammation of the ear usually lasts a few days or more, rarely a few weeks, and then resolves spontaneously and recurs at various intervals. Because of the loss of cartilage, after several flares cauliflower ear deformity may result. The outer part of the ear may be either floppy or hardened by calcifications of the scar tissue that replaces the cartilage. These cauliflower ear deformities occur in about 10% of persons with RP.

==== Nose ====
The inflammation of the cartilage of the nose involves the bridge of the nose and is often less marked than the ears. Statistics show that this clinical manifestation is present in 15% of persons with RP and occurs at some point in 65% of persons with RP. Nasal obstruction is not a common feature. Atrophy may eventually develop secondarily during the disease; this appears gradually and may go unnoticed. This can result in collapse of the nasal septum with saddle-nose deformity, which is painless but irreversible.

==== Respiratory tract ====
Inflammation occurs in the laryngeal, tracheal, and bronchial cartilages. Both of these sites are involved in 10% of persons with RP at presentation and 50% over the course of this autoimmune disease, and are more common among females. The involvement of the laryngotracheobronchial cartilages may be severe and life-threatening; it causes one-third of all deaths among persons with RP. Laryngeal chondritis is manifested as pain above the thyroid gland and, more importantly, as dysphonia with a hoarse voice or transient aphonia. Because this disease is relapsing, recurrent laryngeal inflammation may result in laryngomalacia or permanent laryngeal stenosis with inspiratory dyspnea that may require emergency tracheotomy as a temporary or permanent measure.

Tracheobronchial involvement may or may not be accompanied by laryngeal chondritis and is potentially the most severe manifestation of RP.

The symptoms include shortness of breathing (dyspnea), wheezing, and a nonproductive cough. Obstructive respiratory failure may develop as the result of either permanent tracheal or bronchial narrowing or chondromalacia with expiratory collapse of the tracheobronchial tree. Endoscopy, intubation, or tracheotomy has been shown to hasten death.

==== Ribs ====
Involvement of the rib cartilages results in costochondritis. Symptoms include chest wall pain or, less often, swelling of the involved cartilage. The involvement of the ribs is seen in 35% of persons with RP but is rarely the first symptom.

=== Other manifestations ===
Relapsing polychondritis can affect various organ systems of the body. At first, some people with the disease may have only nonspecific signs and symptoms such as fever, weight loss, and malaise.

==== Joint ====
The second most common clinical finding of this disease is joint pain with or without arthritis, after chondritis. All synovial joints may be affected.

At presentation, around 33% of people have joint symptoms that involve polyarthralgia and/or polyarthritis or oligoarthritis that affects various parts of the body and often appears to be episodic, asymmetric, migratory, and non-deforming. The most common sites of involvement are the metacarpophalangeal joints, proximal interphalangeal joints, and knees. Other affected joints include the ankles, wrists, metatarsophalangeal joints, and the elbows. Involvement of the axial skeleton is very rare. Tests for rheumatoid factor are negative in affected persons with RP, unless there is a co-morbidity with RA.

Less often, it has been reported that persons may experience arthralgia, monoarthritis, or chronic polyarthritis that mimics rheumatoid arthritis, leading to a difficult diagnosis for this disease. The appearance of erosions and destruction, however, is exceedingly rare, and this may point instead to rheumatoid arthritis as a cause.

Diseases and inflammation of tendons have been reported in small numbers of people with RP. During the course of the disease, around 80% of people develop joint symptoms.

==== Eye ====
Involvement of the eye is rarely the initial symptom but develops in 60% of persons with RP. The most common forms of ocular involvement are usually mild and often consist of unilateral or bilateral episcleritis and/or scleritis, that is often anterior and could be lingering or relapsing. Scleritis that is necrotizing is found to be exceedingly rare. Less often, conjunctivitis occurs. Other ocular manifestations occur in persons with RP, these include keratoconjunctivitis sicca, peripheral keratitis (rarely with ulcerations), anterior uveitis, retinal vasculitis, proptosis, lid edema, keratoconus, retinopathy, iridocyclitis and ischemic optic neuritis that can lead to blindness. Cataract also is reported in relation to either the disease or to glucocorticoid exposure.

==== Neurological ====
The involvement of the peripheral or central nervous system is relatively rare and only occurs in 3% of persons affected with RP, and is sometimes seen in relation to concomitant vasculitis. The most common neurological manifestations are palsies of the cranial nerves V and VII. Also hemiplegia, ataxia, myelitis and polyneuropathy have been reported in scientific literature. Very rare neurological manifestations include aseptic meningitis, meningoencephalitis, stroke, focal or generalized seizures and intracranial aneurysm. Magnetic Resonance Imaging of the brain shows multifocal areas of enhancement consistent with cerebral vasculitis in some cases.

==== Kidney ====
The involvement of the kidney can be caused by primary renal parenchymal lesions, an underlying vasculitis, or another associated autoimmune disease. Actual kidney involvement is quite rare, elevated creatinine levels are reported in approximately 10% of people with RP, and abnormalities in urinalysis are reported in 26%. Involvement of the kidney often indicates a worse prognosis, with a 10-year survival rate of 30%. The most common histopathologic finding is mild mesangial proliferation, which is followed by focal and segmental necrotizing glomerulonephritis with crescents. Other abnormalities that are found include glomerulosclerosis, IgA nephropathy and interstitial nephritis. Immunofluorescence studies most often reveal faint deposits of C3, IgG or IgM in the primarily mesangium.

==== Constitutional symptoms ====
These symptoms could consist of asthenia, fever, anorexia, and weight loss. They mostly occur during a severe disease flare.

==== Others ====
- Skin and mucous membranes: 20 to 30% of people with relapsing polychondritis have skin involvement, including aphthous ulcers, genital ulcers, and several non-specific skin rashes, including erythema nodosum, livedo reticularis, hives, and erythema multiforme.
- Cardiovascular system: Relapsing polychrondritis may cause inflammation of the aorta. It can also cause leaky heart valves (aortic valve regurgitation in 4 to 10%, mitral valve regurgitation in 2%).

== Causes ==
Relapsing polychondritis is an autoimmune disease in which the body's immune system begins to attack and destroy the cartilage tissues in the body. It has been postulated that both cell-mediated immunity and humoral immunity are responsible.

The reasons for disease onset are unknown.

== Diagnosis ==
There is no specific test for relapsing polychondritis. Some people may exhibit abnormal lab results, while others may have completely normal labs even during active flares. Patients with ear and nose chondritis with hematological (blood) abnormalities, including macrocytic anemia and thrombocytopenia, should be tested for a newly-recognized disease called VEXAS syndrome.

=== Diagnostic criteria ===
Several clinical criteria are used to diagnose this disease. McAdam et al. introduced the clinical criteria for RP in 1976. These clinical criteria have later been expanded by Damiani et al. in 1979 and finally Michet et al. modified them in 1986. See the following table for these diagnostic clinical criteria and the number of conditions required for an official diagnosis.

Authors	Criteria	Conditions required
McAdam et al.	Bilateral auricular chondritis; Nasal chondritis; Respiratory tract chondritis; Non-erosive seronegative polyarthritis; Ocular inflammation; Audiovestibular damage	3 out of 6 criteria
Damiani et al.	Bilateral auricular chondritis (A); Nasal cartilage inflammation (A); Respiratory tract chondritis (A); Non-erosive sero-negative polyarthritis (A); Ocular inflammation (A); Audiovestibular involvement (A); Histologic confirmation (B); Positive response to corticosteroids or dapsone (C)	3 (A) criteria or; 1 (A) and (B) or; 2 (A) criteria and (C)
Michet et al.	Auricular cartilage inflammation (A); Nasal cartilage inflammation (A); Laryngotracheal cartilage inflammation (A); Ocular inflammation (B); Hearing loss (B); Vestibular dysfunction (B); Sero-negative arthritis (B)	2 out of 3 (A) criteria or; 1 out of 3 (A) criteria and 2 (B) criteria

=== Laboratory findings ===
Patients presenting with acute episodes often have high levels of inflammatory markers such as erythrocyte sedimentation rate (ESR) or C-reactive protein (CRP). Patients often have cartilage-specific antibodies present during acute relapsing polychondritis episodes. Antinuclear antibody reflexive panel, rheumatoid factor, and antiphospholipid antibodies are tests that may assist in the evaluation and diagnosis of autoimmune connective tissue diseases.

=== Imaging studies ===
FDG positron emission tomography (PET) may be useful to detect the condition early. Other imaging studies, including MRI, CT scans, and X-rays, may reveal inflammation and/or damaged cartilage, facilitating diagnosis.

=== Special tests ===
==== Biopsy ====
A biopsy of cartilage tissue (for example, the ear) may demonstrate tissue inflammation and destruction; however, it does not confirm the diagnosis. The Biopsy of cartilage in patients with relapsing polychondritis may demonstrate chondrolysis, chondritis, and perichondritis.

==== Pulmonary function tests ====
PFTs are usually not useful; in most cases, changes in pulmonary function tests will not correlate with tracheomalacia. Therefore, findings on the full set of pulmonary function tests, including inspiratory and expiratory flow-volume loops, usually represent late disease. Patterns consistent with either extrathoracic or intrathoracic obstruction (or both) may occur in this disease. Pulmonary function tests (flow-volume loops) provide a useful noninvasive means of quantifying and following the degree of extrathoracic airway obstruction in relapsing polychondritis.

=== Differential diagnosis ===
A differential diagnosis should be taken into account with the following main RP manifestations.

Manifestation of RP	Differential diagnosis
Arthritis	Rheumatoid arthritis.
Auricular chondritis	Infectious perichondritis, injury, insect bites and stings, ear erysipelas, cystic chondromalacia, overexposure to extreme cold temperatures or to sunlight, frostbite of the ear, congenital syphilis.
Airway/kidney involvement	Granulomatosis with polyangiitis, bronchial asthma.
Nose cartilage involvement/saddle nose	Granulomatosis with polyangiitis, leishmaniasis, congenital syphilis, leprosy, aspergillosis, paracoccidioidomycosis, cocaine inhalation, systemic lupus erythematosus.
Subglottic stenosis	Prior endotracheal intubation, amyloidosis, sarcoidosis.
Vascular involvement	Takayasu's arteritis, polyarteritis nodosa, Behçet's disease, antiphospholipid syndrome.
Vestibular disease	Posterior circulation infarct, vestibulitis, benign paroxysmal vertigo, Ménière's disease.

== Treatment ==
There are no prospective randomized controlled trials studying therapies for relapsing polychondritis. Evidence for the efficacy of treatments is based on many case reports and case series of small groups of patients. There are case reports that non-steroidal anti-inflammatory drugs are effective for mild disease and that corticosteroids are effective for the treatment of severe relapsing polychondritis. There are multiple case reports that dapsone is effective in doses from 25 mg/day to 200 mg/day. Corticosteroid-sparing medications such as azathioprine or methotrexate may be used to minimize steroid doses and limit the side effects of steroids. For severe disease, cyclophosphamide is often given in addition to high-dose intravenous corticosteroids.

== Prognosis ==
Many individuals have mild symptoms, which recur infrequently, while others may have persistent problems that become debilitating or life-threatening.

== Epidemiology ==
Relapsing polychondritis occurs as often in men as in women. In a Mayo Clinic series, the annual incidence was about 3.5 cases per million. The highest incidence is between the ages of 40 and 50 years, but it may occur at any age.

== History ==
In 1923, Rudolf Jaksch von Wartenhorst first discovered relapsing polychondritis while working in Prague and initially named it Polychondropathia.

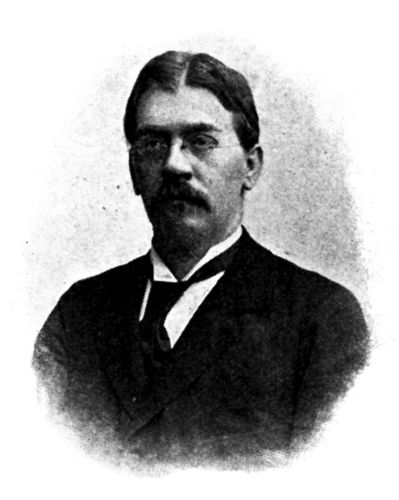
The discoverer of relapsing polychondritis Rudolf Jaksch von Wartenhorst.

His patient was a 32-year-old male brewer who presented with fever, asymmetric polyarthritis, and the ears and nose showed signs of swelling, deformity, and were painful. Biopsy of nasal cartilage revealed loss of the cartilage matrix and a hyperplastic mucous membrane. Jaksch von Wartenhorst considered this to be an undescribed degenerative disorder of cartilage and named it Polychondropathia. He even considered his patient's occupation and related the cause to excessive alcohol intake.

Since then, the disease has received many names. The following table shows the history of the nomenclature of relapsing polychondritis. The current name, Relapsing Polychondritis (RP), was introduced by Pearson and his colleagues in 1960 to emphasize the episodic course of the disease.

Suggested name	Author(s) and year
Polychondropathia	Rudolf Jaksch von Wartenhorst in 1923
Chondromalacia	Von Meyenburg in 1936 and Altherr in 1936
Panchondritis	Harders in 1954
Polychondritis chronica atrophicans	Bober and Czarniecki in 1955
Chronic atrophic polychondritis	Bean, Drevets, and Chapman in 1958
Relapsing polychondritis	Pearson, Kline, and Newcomer in 1960
Atrophic polychondritis	Rhys Davies and Kelsall in 1961

== Research ==
In 2017, a physician, also a patient with the disease, became a rheumatologist to study the disease. Since then, there has been an increase in awareness, as well as different studies that have helped advance the field. There has been little research on neurological problems related to RP. If these cartilage structures get inflamed, they could press against nerves and cause a variety of problems that are seen in RP, like peripheral neuropathy and many more.
