= Hyaline cartilage =

Type of cartilage in humans

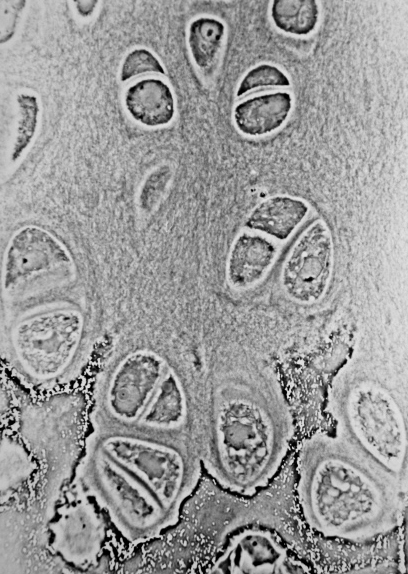
- Light micrograph of undecalcified hyaline cartilage showing microanatomy of chondrocytes and organelles, lacunae and matrix.

Identifiers
- MeSH: D051457
- TH: H2.00.03.5.00015
- FMA: 64783

Hyaline cartilage is the glass-like (hyaline) and translucent cartilage found on many joint surfaces. It is also most commonly found in the ribs, nose, larynx, and trachea. Hyaline cartilage is pearl-gray in color, with a firm consistency and has a considerable amount of collagen. It contains no nerves or blood vessels, and its structure is relatively simple.

== Structure ==
Hyaline cartilage is the most common kind of cartilage in the human body. It is primarily composed of type II collagen and proteoglycans. Hyaline cartilage is located in the trachea, nose, epiphyseal plate, sternum, and ribs.

Hyaline cartilage is covered externally by a fibrous membrane known as the perichondrium. The primary cells of cartilage are chondrocytes, which are in a matrix of fibrous tissue, proteoglycans and glycosaminoglycans.

As cartilage does not have lymph glands or blood vessels, the movements of solutes, including nutrients, occur via diffusion within the fluid compartments contiguous with adjacent tissues. Cartilage gives the structures a definite but pliable form, making them strong, but with limited mobility and flexibility. Cartilage has no nerves.

Hyaline cartilage also forms the temporary embryonic skeleton, which is gradually replaced by bone, and the skeleton of elasmobranch fish.

=== Microanatomy ===
When a slice of hyaline cartilage is examined under the microscope, it is shown to consist of chondrocytes of a rounded or bluntly angular form, lying in groups of two or more in a granular, or almost homogeneous matrix. When arranged in groups of two or more, the chondrocytes have rounded, but generally straight outlines, where they are in contact with each other, and in the rest of their circumference, they are rounded.

They consist of translucent protoplasm with fine interlacing filaments and minute granules are sometimes present. Embedded in this are one or two round nuclei, having the usual intranuclear network.

The cells are contained in cavities in the matrix, called cartilage lacunae. These cavities are actually artificial gaps formed from the shrinking of the cells during the staining and setting of the tissue for examination. The inter-territorial space between the isogenous cell groups contains relatively more collagen fibers, allowing it to maintain its shape while the actual cells shrink, creating the lacunae. This constitutes the so-called 'capsule' of the space. Each lacuna is usually occupied by a single cell, but during mitosis, it may contain two, four, or even eight cells.

=== Articular cartilage ===
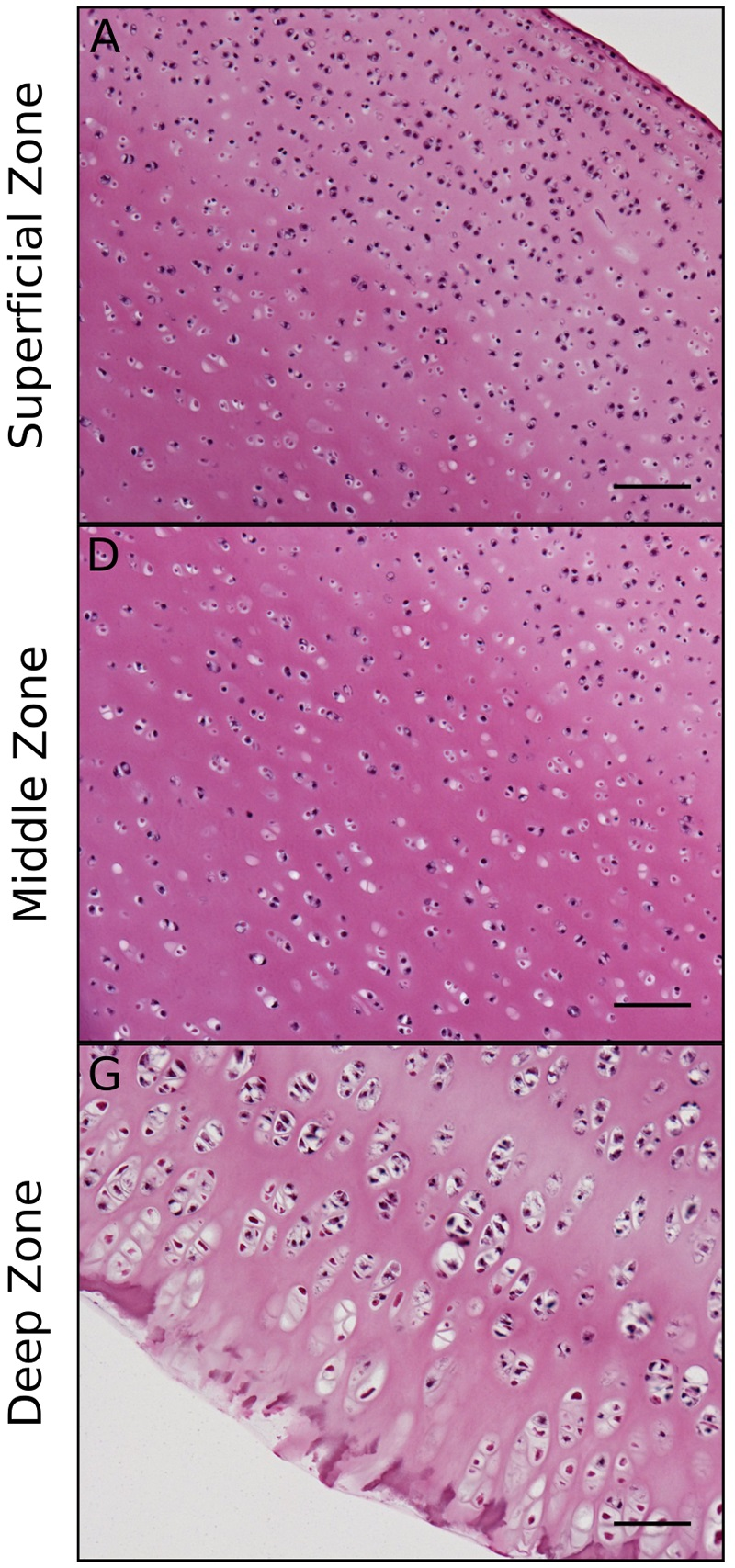
Histology of articular cartilage zones.

Articular cartilage is hyaline cartilage on the articular surfaces of bones, and lies inside the joint cavity of synovial joints, bathed in synovial fluid produced by the synovial membrane, which lines the walls of the cavity.

Though it is often found in close contact with menisci and articular disks, articular cartilage is not considered a part of either of these structures, which are made entirely of fibrocartilage.

The articular cartilage extracellular matrix has a highly specialized architecture that is zonally organized: the superficial zone consists mostly of type II collagen fibers aligned parallel to the articular surface to resist shear forces, whereas the deep zone consists of the same fibers aligned perpendicularly to the bone interface to absorb compressive loads.

The biochemical breakdown of the articular cartilage results in osteoarthritis – the most common type of joint disease. Osteoarthritis affects over 30 million individuals in the United States alone, and is the leading cause of chronic disability amongst the elderly.

Articular cartilage development begins with interzone condensation of a type II collagen positive limb bud at the future joint site. This is followed by definition of specific cellular subtypes (meniscal progenitors, articular progenitors, synovial progenitors, and ligament progenitors) that will eventually form the joint capsule. Finally, the joint capsule matures and forms a cavity, with a central meniscus, and an encasement of synovium. This final structure will form several distinct layers of the articular cartilage found in all synovial joints including the deep zone (closest to the bone), middle zone, and superficial zone (closest to the synovial fluid).

Maintenance of articular cartilage is guided by a balance of anabolic (cartilage generating) and catabolic (cartilage degrading factors), in a manner similar to the maintenance of bone. Over the lifetime of the organism, anabolic factors and catabolic factors are generally in balance, however, as the organism ages, catabolism predominates and cartilage begins to degrade. Eventually, the loss of hyaline cartilage matrix and reduction in the chondrocyte content of the hyaline cartilage matrix results in the development of joint disease such as osteoarthritis. Overexpression of hyaline-cartilage specific anabolic factors, such as FGF18, appears to restore the balance between cartilage loss and generation.

== Additional images ==
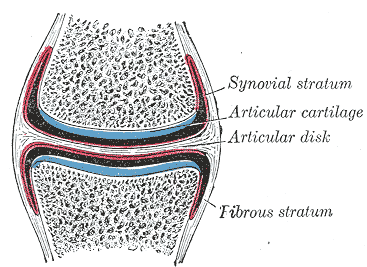
A synovial joint with bone, articular cartilage, and articular disc shown.

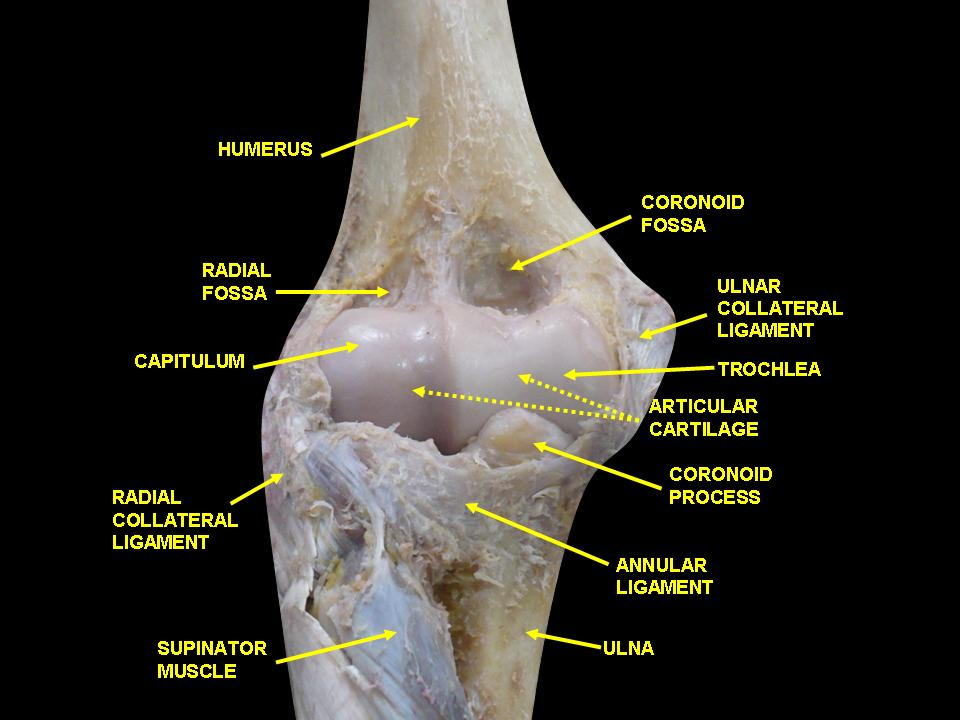
Elbow joint. Deep dissection. Anterior view.

== See also ==
- Articular cartilage damage
- Articular cartilage injuries
- Articular cartilage repair
- List of distinct cell types in the adult human body
