= Líšťany (Plzeň-North District) =

- Municipality
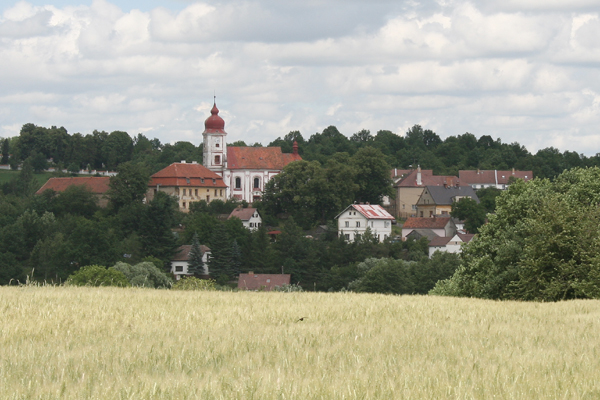
- View from the southwest

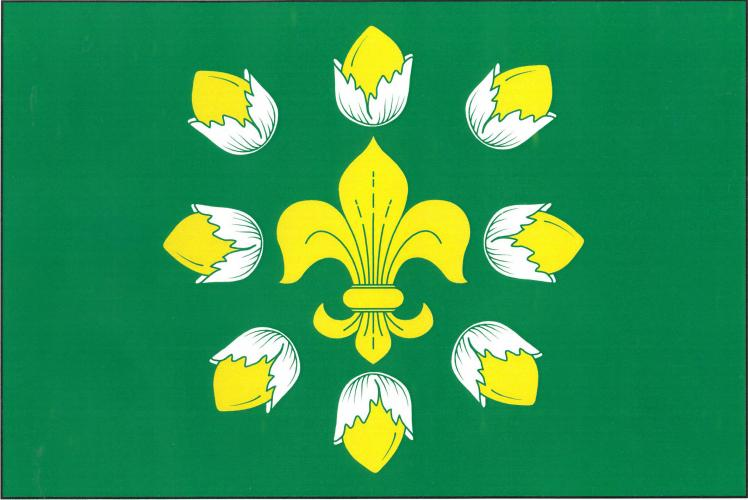
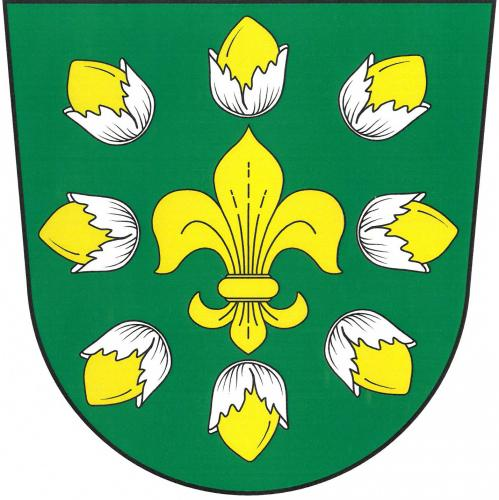
- Flag Coat of arms

- Location in the Czech Republic
- Coordinates: 49°49′52″N 13°10′52″E
- Country: Czech Republic
- Region: Plzeň
- District: Plzeň-North
- First mentioned: 1115

Area
  - Total: 36.75 km^{2} (14.19 sq mi)
- Elevation: 458 m (1,503 ft)

Population (2026-01-01)
  - Total: 791
  - Density: 21.5/km^{2} (55.7/sq mi)
- Time zone: UTC+1 (CET)
  - Summer (DST): UTC+2 (CEST)
- Postal code: 330 35
- Website: www.listany.cz

Líšťany is a municipality and village in Plzeň-North District in the Plzeň Region of the Czech Republic. It has about 800 inhabitants.

Líšťany lies approximately 17 kilometres (11 mi) north-west of Plzeň and 93 km (58 mi) west of Prague.

== Administrative division ==
Líšťany consists of eight municipal parts (in brackets population according to the 2021 census):

- Líšťany (346)
- Hunčice (74)
- Košetice (69)
- Lipno (52)
- Luhov (87)
- Náklov (34)
- Písek (59)
- Třebobuz (37)

== Demographics ==
Historical population
Year	Pop.	±%
1869	1,465	—
1880	1,508	+2.9%
1890	1,525	+1.1%
1900	1,479	−3.0%
1910	1,485	+0.4%
1921	1,499	+0.9%
1930	1,471	−1.9%
1950	774	−47.4%
1961	773	−0.1%
1970	656	−15.1%
1980	583	−11.1%
1991	543	−6.9%
2001	554	+2.0%
2011	693	+25.1%
2021	758	+9.4%
Source: Censuses
