= Chondrocyte =

Cell that composes cartilage

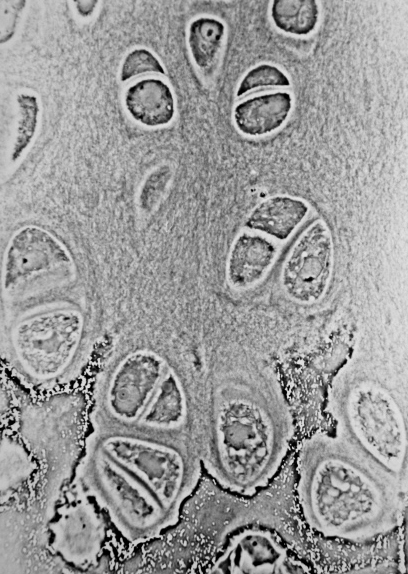
- Light micrograph of undecalcified hyaline cartilage showing its chondrocytes and organelles, lacunae and matrix

Details
- Location: Cartilage
- Function: Produce and maintain cartilage matrix

Identifiers
- Latin: chondrocytus
- MeSH: D019902
- TH: H2.00.03.5.00003
- FMA: 66782

Chondrocytes (/ˈkɒndrəsaɪt, -droʊ-/, from Greek χόνδρος (chondros) 'cartilage' and κύτος (kytos) 'cell') are the only cells found in healthy cartilage. They produce and maintain the cartilaginous matrix, which consists mainly of collagen and proteoglycans. Although the word chondroblast is commonly used to describe an immature chondrocyte, the term is imprecise, since the progenitor of chondrocytes (which are mesenchymal stem cells) can differentiate into various cell types, including osteoblasts.

== Development ==
From least- to terminally-differentiated, the chondrocytic lineage is:

1. Colony-forming unit-fibroblast
2. Mesenchymal stem cell / marrow stromal cell
3. Chondrocyte
4. Hypertrophic chondrocyte

Mesenchymal (mesoderm origin) stem cells are undifferentiated, meaning they can differentiate into a variety of generative cells commonly known as osteochondrogenic (or osteogenic, chondrogenic, osteoprogenitor, etc.) cells. When referring to bone, or in this case cartilage, the originally undifferentiated mesenchymal stem cells lose their pluripotency, proliferate and crowd together in a dense aggregate of chondrogenic cells (cartilage) at the location of chondrification. These chondrogenic cells differentiate into so-called chondroblasts, which then synthesize the cartilage extracellular matrix (ECM), consisting of a ground substance (proteoglycans, glycosaminoglycans for low osmotic potential) and fibers. The chondroblast is now a mature chondrocyte that is usually inactive but can still secrete and degrade the matrix, depending on conditions.

Cell culture studies of excess Vitamin B inhibits the synthesis of chondroitin sulfate by chondrocytes and causes the inhibition of chondrogenesis in the developing embryo which may result in limb malformations.

Chondrocytes undergo terminal differentiation when they become hypertrophic, which happens during endochondral ossification. This last stage is characterized by major phenotypic changes in the cell.

== Structure ==
The chondrocyte in cartilage matrix has rounded or polygonal structure. The exception occurs at tissue boundaries, for example the articular surfaces of joints, in which chondrocytes may be flattened or discoid. Intra-cellular features are characteristic of a synthetically active cell. The cell density of full-thickness, human, adult, femoral condyle cartilage is maintained at 14.5 (±3.0) × 10^{3} cells/ mm^{2} from age 20 to 30 years. Although chondrocyte senescence occurs with aging, mitotic figures are not seen in normal adult articular cartilage. The structure, density, and synthetic activity of an adult chondrocyte are various according to its position. Flattened cells are oriented parallel to the surface, along with the collagen fibers, in the superficial zone, the region of highest cell density. In the middle zone, chondrocytes are larger and more rounded and display a random distribution, in which the collagen fibers also are more randomly arranged. In the deeper zones, chondrocytes form columns that are oriented perpendicular to the cartilage surface, along with the collagen fibers. Different behaviors may be exhibited by chondrocytes depending on their position within the different layers. In primary chondrocyte cultures, these zonal differences in synthetic properties may persist. The primary cilia are significant for spatial orientation of cells in developing growth plate and are sensory organelles in chondrocytes. Primary cilia work as centers for wingless type (Wnt) and hedgehog signaling and contain mechanosensitive receptors.

== Genetics ==
The number of chondrocyte cells created and their maturation process can be influenced by multiple different genes and proteins. Two proteins, bone morphogenetic protein 4 (BMP-4) and fibroblast growth factor 2 (FGF2) have been seen to influence the amount of differentiation into chondrocytes. Both proteins are known to play a role in embryonic stem cell differentiation into mesodermal cells, through signaling with BMP-4 and as FGF2 acting as a stimulator. From the mesodermal germ layer, cells will continue to differentiate down into many different types of cells. On top of BMP-4 and FGF2 stimulating the mesodermal germ layer, treatment of these proteins has also been shown to amplify the number of cells that differentiate down into chondrogenic and osteogenic cells when cultured in chondrogenic and osteogenic mediums respectively. For chondrogenic cells, the treatment showed increased expression of the transcription factor Sox9, which plays a key role in chondrogenesis, the process of cartilage formation from condensed mesenchyme tissues, which then differentiate into chondrocytes.

Endochondral ossification is the process by which most vertebrate axial skeletons form into hardened bones from cartilage. This process begins with a cartilage anlage where chondrocyte cells will congregate and start their maturation process. Once the chondrocytes have fully matured at the desired rate, the cartilage tissue will harden into bone. This process is similar across most vertebrates and is closely regulated due to the large importance of the skeleton in survival. Few deviations, misregulations, and mutations are found in organisms because they are often detrimental or lethal to the organism. This is why chondrocyte maturation is so tightly regulated. If they mature too quickly or slowly there is a large possibility the organism will not survive gestation or infancy. One gene that is closely involved in skeletal formation is Xylt1. Normally, this gene is responsible for catalyzing the addition of glycosaminoglycan (GAG) side chains to proteoglycans, which are used during cell signaling to control processes such as cell growth, proliferation, and adhesion. The two main proteoglycans that are used in this process are heparan sulfate proteoglycans (HSPGs) and chondroitin sulfate proteoglycans (CSPGs) which are present at high levels in the chondrocyte extracellular matrix and are crucial in regulating chondrocyte maturation. When the GAG chain functions properly, it controls the maturation speed of chondrocytes and ensures enough cells gather in the cartilage anlage. Xylt1 is an essential gene in regards to chondrocytes and proper skeletal formation, and is a key factor in the close regulation of maturation. However, the mutation pug of the Xylt1 gene was studied in mice in 2014 and was found to cause the pre-maturation of chondrocytes. Animals with homozygous pug alleles display dwarfism and have considerably shorter bones compared to wild-type animals. These organisms show a reduction of typical Xylt1 gene activity, as well as a reduction in GAG chain levels. This mutation causes fewer GAG chains to be added to HSPGs and CSPGs, meaning there are fewer complexes available to closely regulate the maturation of chondrocytes. Incorrect signals are sent to chondrocytes in the cartilage anlage because the GAG chain and proteoglycan complexes are unable to work properly and cause the chondrocytes to mature and ossify too quickly. The correct amount of chondrocytes are not able to gather in the cartilage anlage, leading to a shortage of cartilage for ossification and eventually shorter bones.

While the pug mutation deals with the pre-maturation of chondrocytes, multiple other mutations alter chondrocyte proliferation. One such example, the point mutation G380R located on the fibroblast growth factor receptor 3 (FGFR-3) gene leads to achondroplasia, a type of dwarfism. Achondroplasia is either caused through a spontaneous mutation or inherited in an autosomal dominant fashion. Both the homozygous dominant and the heterozygous genotypes exhibit achondroplasia symptoms, but the heterozygotes are often milder. Individuals with the mutated allele(s) display a variety of symptoms of the failure of endochondral ossification, including the shortening of proximal long limbs and midface hypoplasia. The non-mutated FGFR-3 gene is responsible for the expression of fibroblast growth factors (FGFs) which has to maintain a certain level to ensure that the proliferation of chondrocytes happens accordingly. The G380R mutation causes FGFR-3 to over express FGFs and the balance within the cartilage extracellular matrix is thrown off. Chondrocytes will proliferate too quickly and disrupt the assembly at the cartilage anlage and detrimentally alter the formation of bone. This mutation acts in a dosage fashion, meaning that when only one copy is present, there is still an uptake in FGF expression, but less so than when there are two copies of the mutation.

== Chondrocyte Primary Culture ==
Chondrocytes can be prepared by sequential enzymatic digestion of cartilage with Pronase and Collagenase and cultured in DMEM-F12 cell culture media.

Transplantation of dedifferentiated chondrocytes often leads to the formation of fibrous tissue formation. Redifferentiation of dedifferentiated chondrocytes in the 3-D system (spheroid culture) restore morphological and functional properties.

== Medical uses ==
Carticel is a procedure for restoring articular knee cartilage with autologous chondrocyte implantation; it was the first cell therapy to be approved by the U.S. Food and Drug Administration, under accelerated approval in 1997.

In Australia, Ortho-ACI, a suspension of cultured autologous chondrocytes, is indicated for use in the treatment of cartilage lesions associated with the knee, patella, and ankle.

== Gallery ==
Chondrocytes in hyaline cartilage

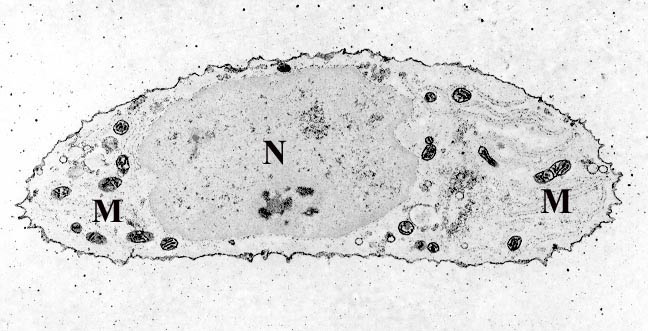
Transmission electron micrograph of a chondrocyte, stained for calcium, showing its nucleus (N) and mitochondria (M)

== See also ==
- Chondronectin
- Endochondral ossification
- Intramembranous ossification
- List of human cell types derived from the germ layers
- List of distinct cell types in the adult human body
