= Spontaneous osteonecrosis of the knee =

- Other names: Ahlback's disease
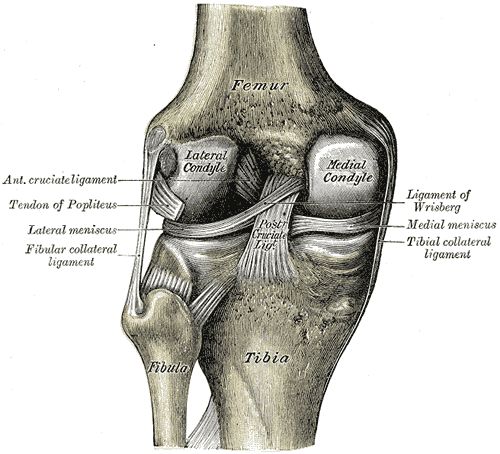
- Medial femoral condyle (right of center)

Spontaneous osteonecrosis of the knee is the result of vascular arterial insufficiency to the medial femoral condyle of the knee resulting in necrosis and destruction of bone. It is often unilateral and can be associated with a meniscal tear.

== Signs and symptoms ==
The condition is usually characterized by a sudden onset of knee pain, worse at night, or during weight-bearing such as standing or running. Nevertheless, it can also occur during rest or without any weight-bearing. About 94% of the cases affect the medial condyle of the femur. This is because the blood supply for the medial condyle is less than the blood supply for the lateral condyle of the femur. The condition may deteriorate, causing asymmetrical walking or running pattern. Sometimes, they have a history of osteoporosis or osteopenia.

Localised tenderness over the medial knee is the most common finding of the condition. It is usually happening on one side, without a previous history of trauma. SONK should be considered together with differential diagnosis of osteoarthritis, tear of medial meniscus, and tibial plateau fracture. SONK usually has a sudden onset of knee pain, while osteoarthritis has a progressive, gradual onset of knee pain.

== Cause ==
It is more common in females over the age of 50 with possible risk factors of corticosteroid use, lupus, alcoholism, pancreatitis, sickle cell anemia, and rheumatoid arthritis.

== Diagnosis ==
In the early stages of the disease, there are no obvious X-ray findings. The presence of radiolucent area in the epiphyseal region and flattening of the femoral condyle can be found in late stages of the disease. MRI has been proven to be both sensitive and specific for the disease. Both T1 and T2 imaging of the MRI shows bone marrow oedema, subchondral low signal, subchondral crescent linear focus, and focal epiphyseal contour depression.

== Treatment ==
Total knee arthroplasty (TKA) is the standard of care. However, in SONK, often just one side of the knee joint is afflicted, so unicompartmental knee arthroplasty (UKA) can be considered as an alternative that leads to a shorter recovery time. A meta-analysis concluded that UKA was "an excellent alternative to TKA" with few complications and good survivorship.

== See also ==
- Avascular necrosis
- Osteonecrosis of the jaw
- Dysbaric osteonecrosis

== Sources ==
- Souza, Thomas (2007). Lower Extremity: Technique and Management. Palmer College of Chiropractic.
