= Articular cartilage repair =

Orthopedic surgical procedure

- Specialty: Orthopedic

Articular cartilage repair treatment involves the repair of the surface of the articular joint's hyaline cartilage, though these solutions do not perfectly restore the articular cartilage. These treatments have been shown to have positive results for patients who have articular cartilage damage. They can provide some measure of pain relief, while slowing down the accumulation of damage, or delaying the need for joint replacement (knee replacement) surgery.

== Different articular cartilage repair procedures ==
Though the different articular cartilage repair procedures differ in the technologies and surgical techniques used, they all share the same aim to repair articular cartilage whilst keeping options open for alternative treatments in the future. Broadly taken, there are five major types of articular cartilage repair:

=== Arthroscopic lavage / debridement ===
Arthroscopic lavage is a "cleaning up" procedure of the knee joint. This short-term solution is not considered as an articular cartilage repair procedure but rather a palliative treatment to reduce pain, mechanical restriction and inflammation. Lavage focuses on removing degenerative articular cartilage flaps and fibrous tissue. The main target groups are patients with very small defects of the articular cartilage.

=== Marrow stimulation techniques (micro-fracture surgery and others) ===
Marrow stimulating techniques attempt to solve articular cartilage damage through an arthroscopic procedure. Firstly, the damaged cartilage is drilled or punched until the underlying bone is exposed. By doing this, the subchondral bone is perforated to generate a blood clot within the defect. Studies, however, have shown that marrow stimulation techniques often have insufficiently filled the chondral defect and the repair material is often fibrocartilage (which is not as good mechanically as hyaline cartilage). The blood clot takes about 8 weeks to become fibrous tissue and it takes 4 months to become fibrocartilage. This has implications for the rehabilitation.

Further on, chances are high that after only 1 or 2 years of the surgery symptoms start to return as the fibrocartilage wears away, forcing the patient to reengage in articular cartilage repair. This is not always the case and microfracture surgery is therefore considered to be an intermediate step.

An evolvement of the microfracture technique is the implantation of a collagen membrane onto the site of the microfracture to protect and stabilize the blood clot and to enhance the chondrogenic differentiation of the MSCs. This technique is known as AMIC (Autologous Matrix-Induced Chondrogenesis) and was first published in 2003.

Microfracture techniques show new potential, as animal studies indicate that microfracture-activated skeletal stem-cells form articular cartilage, instead of fibrous tissue, when co-delivered with a combination of BMP2 and VEGF receptor antagonist.

=== Marrow stimulation augmented with hydrogel implant ===
A hydrogel implant to help the body regrow cartilage in the knee is currently being studied in U.S. and European clinical trials. Called GelrinC, the implant is made of a synthetic material called polyethylene glycol (PEG) and denatured human fibrinogen protein.

During the standard microfracture procedure, the implant is applied to the cartilage defect as a liquid. It is then exposed to UVA light for 90 seconds, turning it into a solid, soft implant that completely occupies the space of the cartilage defect. The implant is designed to support the formation of hyaline cartilage through a unique guided tissue mechanism. It protects the repair site from infiltration of undesired fibrous tissue while providing the appropriate environment for hyaline cartilage matrix formation. Over six to 12 months, the implant resorbs from its surface inward, enabling it to be gradually replaced with new cartilage.

Preliminary clinical studies in Europe have shown the implant improves pain and function.{{Dubious [this reference is no longer available December 2023]|date=July 2023|this reference does not seem to indicate that?}}

=== Marrow stimulation augmented with peripheral blood stem cells ===
A 2011 study reports histologically confirmed hyaline cartilage regrowth in a 5 patient case-series, 2 with grade IV bipolar or kissing lesions in the knee. The successful protocol involves arthroscopic microdrilling/ microfracture surgery followed by postoperative injections of autologous peripheral blood progenitor cells (PBPC's) and hyaluronic acid (HA). PBPC's are a blood product containing mesenchymal stem cells and is obtained by mobilizing the stem cells into the peripheral blood. Khay Yong Saw and his team propose that the microdrilling surgery creates a blood clot scaffold on which injected PBPC's can be recruited and enhance chondrogenesis at the site of the contained lesion. They explain that the significance of this cartilage regeneration protocol is that it is successful in patients with historically difficult-to-treat grade IV bipolar or bone-on-bone osteochondral lesions.

Saw and his team are currently conducting a larger randomized trial and working towards beginning a multicenter study. The work of the Malaysian research team is gaining international attention.

=== Osteochondral autografts and allografts ===
This technique/repair requires transplant sections of bone and cartilage. First, the damaged section of bone and cartilage is removed from the joint. Then a new healthy dowel of bone with its cartilage covering is punched out of the same joint and replanted into the hole left from removing the old damaged bone and cartilage. The healthy bone and cartilage are taken from areas of low stress in the joint so as to prevent weakening the joint. Depending on the severity and overall size of the damage multiple plugs or dowels may be required to adequately repair the joint, which becomes difficult for osteochondral autografts. The clinical results may deteriorate over time.

For osteochondral allografts, the plugs are taken from deceased donors. This has the advantage that more osteochondral tissue is available and larger damages can be repaired using either the plug (snowman) technique or by hand carving larger grafts. There are, however, worries on the histocompatibility, though no rejection drugs are required and infection has been shown to be lesser than that of a total knee or hip. Osteochondral allografting using donor cartilage has been used most historically in knees, but is also emerging in hips, ankles, shoulders and elbows. Patients are typically younger than 55, with BMI below 35, and have a desire to maintain a higher activity level that traditional joint replacements would not allow. Advances in tissue preservation and surgical technique are quickly growing this surgery in popularity.

=== Joint distraction arthroplasty ===
This technique involves physically separating a joint for a period of time (typically 8–12 weeks) to allow for cartilage regeneration.

=== Cell-based repairs ===
Aiming to obtain the best possible results, scientists have striven to replace damaged articular cartilage with healthy articular cartilage. Previous repair procedures, however, always generated fibrocartilage or, at best, a combination of hyaline and fibrocartilage repair tissue. Autologous chondrocyte implantation (ACI) procedures are cell-based repairs that aim to achieve a repair consisting of healthy articular cartilage.

ACI articular cartilage repair procedures take place in three stages. First, cartilage cells are extracted arthroscopically from the patient's healthy articular cartilage that is located in a non load-bearing area of either the intercondylar notch or the superior ridge of the femoral condyles. Then these extracted cells are transferred to an in vitro environment in specialised laboratories where they grow and replicate, for approximately four to six weeks, until their population has increased to a sufficient amount. Finally, the patient undergoes a second surgery where the in vitro chondrocytes are applied to the damaged area. In this procedure, chondrocytes are injected and applied to the damaged area in combination with either a membrane or a matrix structure. These transplanted cells thrive in their new environment, forming new articular cartilage.

=== Autologous mesenchymal stem cell transplant ===
For years, the concept of harvesting stem cells and re-implanting them into one's own body to regenerate organs and tissues has been embraced and researched in animal models. In particular, mesenchymal stem cells have been shown in animal models to regenerate cartilage. Recently, there has been a published case report of decrease in knee pain in a single individual using autologous mesenchymal stem cells. An advantage to this approach is that a person's own stem cells are used, avoiding transmission of genetic diseases. It is also minimally invasive, minimally painful and has a very short recovery period. This alternative to the current available treatments was shown not to cause cancer in patients who were followed for 3 years after the procedure.

See also Stem cell transplantation for articular cartilage repair

=== Drug therapies ===
While there are currently no drugs approved for human use, there are multiple drugs currently in development which are aimed at slowing the progression of cartilage degeneration and even potentially repairing it. These are usually referred to DMOADs.

== The importance of rehabilitation in articular cartilage repair ==
Rehabilitation following any articular cartilage repair procedure is paramount for the success of any articular cartilage resurfacing technique. The rehabilitation is often long and demanding. The main reason is that it takes a long time for the cartilage cells to adapt and mature into repair tissue. Cartilage is a slow adapting substance. Where a muscle takes approximately 35 weeks to fully adapt itself, cartilage only undergoes 75% adaptation in 2 years. If the rehabilitation period is too short, the cartilage repair might be put under too much stress, causing the repair to fail.

== Concerns ==
New research by Robert Litchfield, September 2008, of the University of Western Ontario concluded that routinely practised knee surgery is ineffective at reducing joint pain or improving joint function in people with osteoarthritis. The researchers did however find that arthroscopic surgery did help a minority of patients with milder symptoms, large tears or other damage to the meniscus — cartilage pads that improve the congruence between femur and tibia bones. Similarly, a 2013 Finnish study found surgery to be ineffective for knee surgery (arthroscopic partial meniscectomy), by comparing to sham treatment.
