= Autologous matrix-induced chondrogenesis =

Surgical procedure

Autologous matrix-induced chondrogenesis (AMIC) is a treatment for articular cartilage damage. It combines microfracture surgery with the application of a bi-layer collagen I/III membrane. The 2017 assession determine tentative short to medium term benefits of AMIC.

The initialism AMIC, often used as a genericized trademark, is a registered trademark of Ed. Geistlich Söhne AG, protected by German Registration No. 30255356 and international Registration No. 840373.

== Procedure ==
Autologous Matrix Induced Chondrogenesis (AMIC) surgery is a single step procedure. After arthroscopic evaluation of the cartilage damage and decision for an AMIC procedure a mini arthrotomy is performed. An all-arthroscopic AMIC procedure for repair of cartilage defects of the knee is also possible.

== History ==
The AMIC procedure was first proposed by Behrens in 2003. it aims to extend the use of microfracture surgery to larger cartilage lesions > 2.5 cm2. Its clinical efficiency in autologous chondrocyte implantation (ACI), another cartilage repair technique for larger cartilage lesions, has been studied.

In general various factors have been identified as potentially crucial to the aftermath of the cartilage repair, regardless of the technique used. Amongst them are the species and age of the individual, the size and localization of the articular cartilage defect, the surgical technique, and the postoperative rehabilitation protocol. The latter has been found especially important for microfracture surgery and therefore for AMIC.

The basic procedure of Microfracture surgery was developed by JR Steadman in the late 80’s and early 90’s. It is a well documented cartilage repair technique and first line treatment option for small cartilage lesions. AMIC evolved with the aim to improve some of the shortfalls of microfracture surgery as for instance variable repair cartilage volume and functional deterioration over time.
