= John Saringer =

Canadian engineer

John H. Saringer is a professional engineer who graduated from the University of Toronto in 1977 and specializes in biomechanics and the development of products to accelerate healing and mitigate the effects of immobility.

== Career ==
Until 1982 Saringer was a Research Associate in fluid mechanics at University of Toronto, taught an undergraduate course in statistics, was a PhD student at McMaster and was actively building an engineering consulting firm called S+J Engineering with his partner David F. James. Also in 1982, Saringer left academia to devote his full attention to building Toronto Medical Corp where he was the principal shareholder, CEO and director of research and development until the sale of the company in 1997.

Saringer met Dr R.B. Salter in 1978 to begin a 20-year-long collaboration designing and building passive movement devices based on Salter's work. With Dr R.B. Salter, Saringer introduced and promoted the widespread acceptance and commercialization of Continuous Passive Motion (CPM) devices worldwide. Toronto Medical Corp was sold to Orthologic in 1997 who subsequently resold it.

Since 1992, Saringer has developed three new technologies, one related to therapeutic cooling (Microcool) to maintain an ideal healing environment and reduced pain for post operative care, a hot/cold pain relief device called Iceotherm for treating chronic pain and triggering a healing response, and passive wave movement devices for promoting circulation and mitigating the harmful effects of immobility.

Saringer operates his research lab from a 3,000 sq ft (280 m^{2}) facility located on a 55-acre (220,000 m^{2}) retreat centre where he lives.

Saringer is a former President of Mensa Canada, former Director of Mensa International, and has also published short stories, articles and academic papers. He has held numerous directorships, is politically active promoting environmental and sustainable economic development. Saringer is currently involved in an archaeology project in Malta and is currently CEO in his new business start up, Saringer Life Science Technologies Inc. Saringer holds 17 US patents and over 30 patents worldwide.

Since 2001, Saringer worked with Dr. Jack Hirsh and other researchers from McMaster University in the development of the Venowave. The Venowave is a calf compression peristaltic pump that produces an upward volumetric displacement motion in order to increase blood circulation in the leg. The device has been clinically tested and shown statistically significant results in improving deep vein thrombosis and reducing symptoms of post-thrombotic syndrome / postphlebitic syndrome. Studies are currently underway to evaluate the device's efficacy in other applications where increased circulation in the leg and improved oxygen transport to the leg is needed. The clinical applications such as intermittent claudication and wound healing (venous, arterial, and diabetic foot wounds) are some of the current studies being researched. Saringer has concurrently been developing the Iceotherm medical device which uses T. Thunberg's thermal grill illusion hot and cold treatment to block out the physiological feeling of chronic pain.
