= AMIC =

AMIC may refer to:

- Aberdeen Mosque and Islamic Centre
- Asian Media Information and Communication Centre, a charity in Singapore
- Autologous matrix-induced chondrogenesis, a surgical procedure
