= HTO =

HTO may refer to:

== Places ==
- HTO Park a beach in Toronto, Ontario, Canada

== Transportation ==
- East Hampton Airport, in New York, United States
- Hightown railway station, in England

== Science and technology ==
- High tibial osteotomy
- High Temperature Oxide
- Hohmann transfer orbit
- Holocene thermal optimum
- Waco HTO, an American biplane
- Partially tritiated water

== Business ==
- Hostile takeover
- Hellenic Tourist Organisation

== Other uses ==
- Haupttreuhandstelle Ost, a Nazi state institution in occupied Poland
- Minica Huitoto, spoken in Colombia and Peru
- OTE, a Greek telecommunications company
