= Knee prosthesis =

Knee prosthesis may refer to:

- A prosthesis of the lower limb, starting at the knee
- Knee replacement without replacing the rest of the leg.
