= Richard Steadman =

Pioneering American orthopedic surgeon (1937–2023)

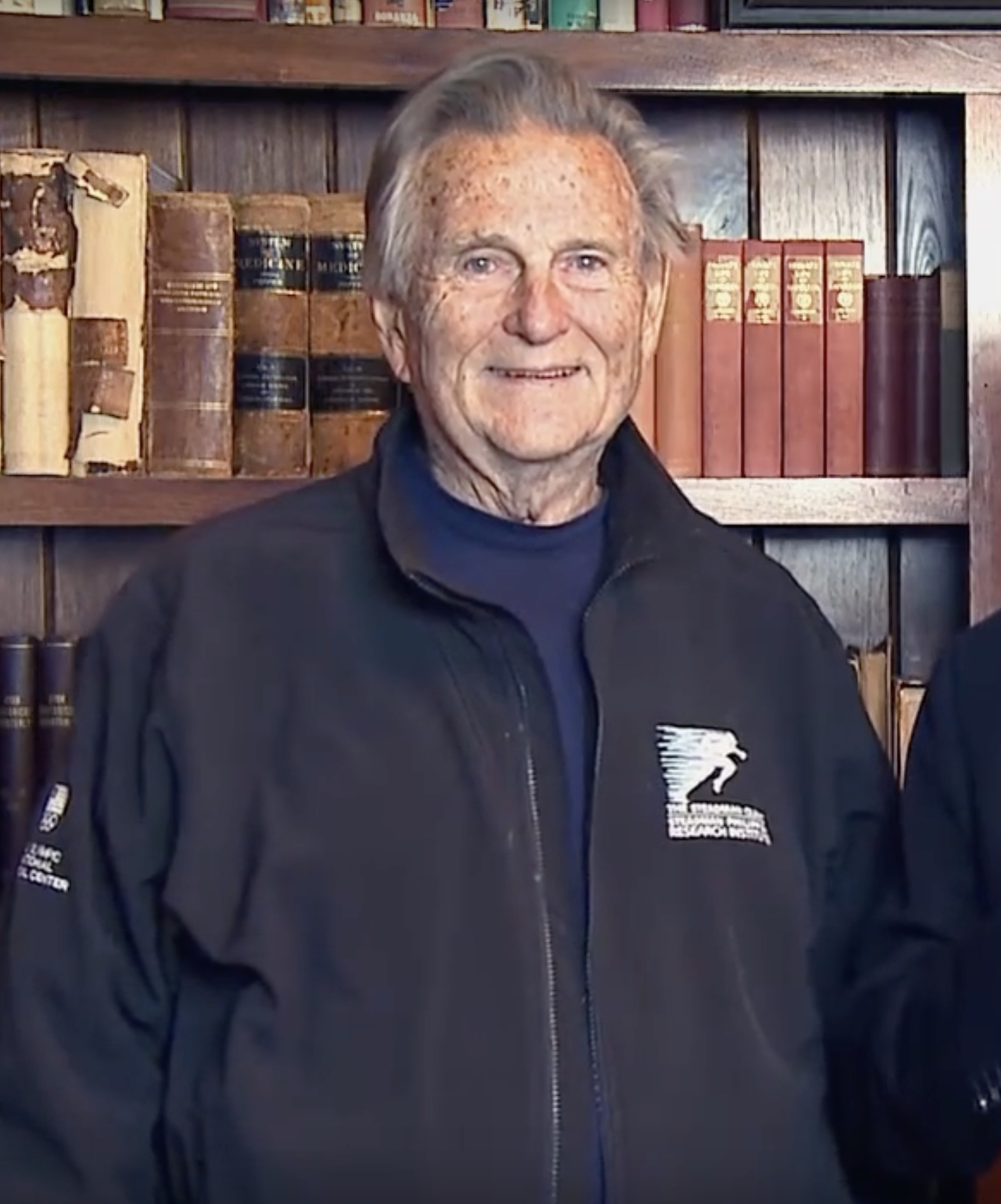
- Steadman in 2016
- Born: J. Richard Steadman; 1937; Sherman, Texas, U.S.
- Died: January 20, 2023 (aged 85); Vail, Colorado, U.S.
- Education: Texas A&M University; University of Texas Southwestern Medical School
- Known for: microfracture surgery, arthrofibrosis
- Medical career
- Profession: Surgeon
- Institutions: University of Texas Southwestern Medical Center
- Sub-specialties: orthopedics, knee
- Awards: Inductee, Colorado Ski Hall of Fame; Albert Trillat Award; H. Edward Cabaud Memorial Award; GOTS-Beiersdorf Prize; Inductee, American Orthopedic Society for Sports Medicine (AOSSM) Hall of Fame

J. Richard Steadman (June 4, 1937 – January 20, 2023) was an American orthopedic surgeon and founder of The Steadman Clinic and Steadman Philippon Research Institute (SPRI) located in Vail, Colorado. Steadman revolutionized orthopedic surgery. For a time, he was a clinical professor at the University of Texas Southwestern Medical Center in Dallas, but was known for his work in the area of microfracture surgery, and for treating injured sports stars from around the world. In January 2014, he announced his retirement from his surgical practice.

== Early life and education ==
Born in Sherman, Texas, Steadman received his undergraduate degree from Texas A&M University. Following internship, two years in the US Army, and residency at Charity Hospital in New Orleans,

== Career ==
Steadman moved to Lake Tahoe, California, where he practiced orthopedics, with increasing emphasis on the treatment of knee disorders. His first elite sports client was alpine ski racer Cindy Nelson, and in 1976 he was named chief physician for the United States Ski Team. In 1989, his work was recognized with his election to the U.S. National Ski Hall of Fame.

Steadman created his non-profit Steadman Sports Medicine Research Foundation in 1988 in Lake Tahoe. In 1990, Steadman moved to Vail, Colo., to open The Steadman Clinic and broaden the scope of his orthopaedic research work.

=== Accomplishments ===
Steadman developed numerous techniques for knee surgery and rehabilitation that made him an expert on sports injuries. He was an expert in the repair and rehabilitation of knee injuries. He popularized microfracture knee surgery, a technique used to repair cartilage by poking tiny holes near the defective area.

The complexity of the knee and its critical importance to athletic performance persuaded Steadman to focus nearly exclusively on disorders and injuries to that joint. Between 1989 and 1991, he worked to develop a treatment for a specific type of injury to the anterior cruciate ligament. It came to be known as the "healing response," which was designed to leverage the body's own healing potential.

Steadman was also a pioneer in physical therapy and post-operative rehabilitation. Though unconventional at the time, he believed it was better to move an injured joint post-surgery rather than stabilizing it with a traditional plaster cast. His idea changed the way orthopedic surgeons and physical therapy professionals treat injuries around the world.

Steadman treated Olympians and professional athletes across various sports. Steadman's success in helping elite athletes who had suffered potentially career-ending injuries return to major athletic achievements included professional soccer players, NFL athletes, MLB players, NBA athletes and skiers.

On January 29, 2014, Steadman announced that he was retiring from active surgical practice, however, he planned to continue consulting with his physician colleagues at The Steadman Clinic and serving as co-chairman of the Steadman Philippon Research Institute. He said, "I cannot imagine a more fulfilling career than the one I have had as an orthopaedic physician. I'm lucky to have had so many patients determined to win again in their sports after serious knee injuries. Their will to succeed has played a large part in my success in treating them. Now I look forward to taking part in further research projects with SPRI scientists."

Among the elite Olympian and professional athletes who went to Steadman's clinic for procedures were: Ronaldo, Jamie Carragher, Martina Navratilova, Lindsay Davenport, Dan Marino, Joe Montana, John Elway, Bruce Smith, Bode Miller and Picabo Street.

== Awards ==
- Albert Trillat Award for Excellence in Knee Research from the International Society for the Knee
- H. Edward Cabaud Memorial Award for Knee Research from the American Orthopedic Society for Sports Medicine
- GOTS-Beiersdorf Prize, Germany
- American Orthopaedic Society for Sports Medicine (AOSSM) Hall of Fame
- 2001 Induction into the Colorado Ski Hall of Fame
