= Articular cartilage damage =

Articular cartilage damage in the knee may be found on its own but it will more often be found in conjunction with injuries to ligaments and menisci. People with previous surgical interventions face more chances of articular cartilage damage due to altered mechanics of the joint. Articular cartilage damage may also be found in the shoulder causing pain, discomfort and limited movement. Cartilage structures and functions can be damaged. Such damage can result from a variety of causes, such as a bad fall or traumatic sport-accident, previous knee injuries or wear and tear over time. Immobilization for long periods can also result in cartilage damage.

Articular cartilage does not usually regenerate (the process of repair by formation of the same type of tissue) after injury or disease leading to loss of tissue and formation of a defect. This fact was first described by William Hunter in 1743. Several surgical techniques have been developed in the effort to repair articular cartilage defects.

== Mechanism ==
Articular cartilage has a very limited capacity for self repair. Small damage does not repair itself and can often get worse over time. As cartilage is aneural and avascular (lack of nerve and blood supply, respectively), shallow damage often does not trigger pain.

When the damage increases and the chondral defect reaches the subchondral bone, the blood supply in the bone starts a healing process in the defect. Scar tissue made up of a type of cartilage called fibrocartilage is then formed. Although fibrocartilage is able to fill in articular cartilage defects, its structure is significantly different from that of hyaline cartilage; it is much denser and it doesn't withstand the demands of everyday activities as much as hyaline cartilage. It is therefore at a higher risk of breaking down.

Wang et al. (2006) found that small articular cartilage defects can progress to osteoarthritis over time if left untreated. An articular cartilage defect that initially may be small still has the potential to have a physical and chemical "domino effect" on the surrounding "normal" articular cartilage.

Pitkin et al. (2014) discovered a potential etiology for articular cartilage damage. When the interarticular transmission of pressures is interrupted so that cartilage cannot distribute its pressure load to adjacent joints, it bears exceptionally high loads, which in time lead to degradation.

== Diagnosis ==
No non-invasive tests are currently able to diagnose articular cartilage damage. Additionally, symptoms vary considerably from person to person. Or as Dr. Karen Hambly stated:

You may or may not have pain and you could have no, or limited, swelling. Yes you may experience locking if a piece of articular cartilage has broken off and is a loose body in the joint or you may experience catching or giving way. You are likely to have some muscle wasting and difficulty in activities such as going up and down stairs, walking or running but then people with any moderate knee injury are likely to as well. This is why articular cartilage damage is the 'Cinderella' of knee problems. It tends to be diagnosed only after other structures have been ruled out – well if it isn't your meniscus or ligaments, what else could it be, perhaps we should look at the articular cartilage?

— Dr. Karen Hambly, Articular Cartilage Repair of the Knee

MRI-scans are becoming more valuable in the analysis of articular cartilage but their use is still expensive and time-consuming. X-rays show only bone injuries and are therefore not very helpful in diagnosing cartilage damage, especially not in early stages. The best tool for diagnosing articular damage is the use of arthroscopy.

=== Measuring cartilage damage ===
The International Cartilage Repair Society has set up an arthroscopic grading system by which cartilage defects can be ranked:

- grade 0: (normal) healthy cartilage
- grade 1: the cartilage has a soft spot, blisters, or superficial wear
- grade 2: minor tears of less than one-half the thickness of the cartilage layer
- grade 3: lesions have deep crevices of more than one-half the thickness of the cartilage layer
- grade 4: the cartilage tear is full thickness and exposes the underlying (subchondral) bone

Doctors will often also measure the size of each defect. Defects smaller than 2 cm^{2}, for example, are considered to be small. It is also important to remember that although the amount of damage is an important factor, the location of the defect(s) can also influence the symptoms you are getting in terms of pain and function and their repair options available.

In contrast to popular perception, pain is not a good indicator for determining the extent of articular cartilage damage. One person can have severe pain with a single small defect while another person can have very little pain with several large full thickness defects.

Since articular cartilage does not have a blood supply and chondrocytes (cells in articular cartilage) have limited mobility, the articular cartilage has very limited ability to heal itself. If left untreated, the cartilage lesions will gradually worsen and the grade of the lesion or defect will increase.

== Treatment ==
Though articular cartilage damage is not life-threatening, it does strongly affect one's quality of life. Articular cartilage damage is often the cause of severe pain, knee swelling, substantial reduction in mobility and severe restrictions to one's activities. Over the last decades, however, research has focused on regenerating damaged joints.

These regenerative procedures are believed to delay osteoarthritis of injuries on the articular cartilage of the knee, by slowing down the degeneration of the joint compared to untreated damage. According to Mithoefer et al. (2006), these articular cartilage repair procedures offer the best results when the intervention takes place in the early stages of the cartilage damage.
