= Unicompartmental knee arthroplasty =

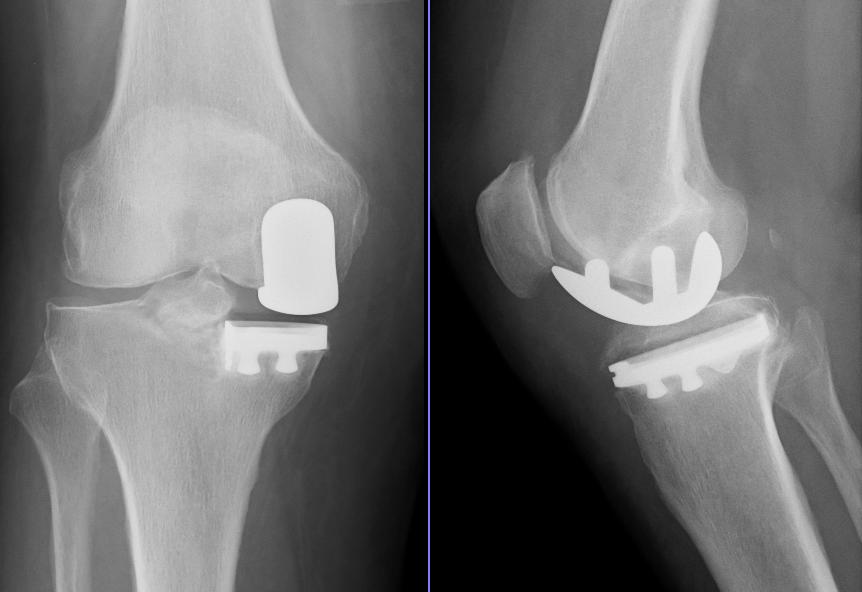
- Radiographs of a knee arthroplasty of the medial compartment
- ICD-9-CM: 81.54

Unicompartmental knee arthroplasty (UKA) is a surgical procedure used to relieve arthritis in one of the knee compartments in which the damaged parts of the knee are replaced. UKA surgery may reduce post-operative pain and have a shorter recovery period than a total knee replacement procedure, particularly in people over 75 years of age. Moreover, UKAs may require a smaller incision, less tissue damage, and faster recovery times.

In the United States, the procedure constitutes approximately 8% of knee arthroplasties. In comparisons with a more extensive surgical procedure called high tibial osteotomy, UKA has equal or better outcomes.

== Background ==
In the early 1950s, Duncan C. McKeever theorized that osteoarthritis could be isolated to only one compartment of the knee joint, and that replacement of the entire knee might not be necessary if only one knee compartment were affected. The UKA concept was designed to cause less trauma or damage than traditional total knee replacement by removing less bone and trying to maintain most of the person's bone and anatomy. The concept was also designed to use smaller implants and thereby keep most of the person's bone, helping them return to normal function faster.

Initially, UKAs were not always successful, because the implants were poorly designed, people needing the surgery were not thoroughly screened for suitability, and optimal surgical techniques were not developed. Advancements have been made to improve the design of the implants. Also, choosing the best-suited people was emphasized to ensure that surgeons followed the indications and contraindications for partial replacement. Proper selection, following the indications/contraindications, and performing the surgery well are key factors for the success of UKA.

== Indications and contraindications ==
UKA may be suitable for people with moderate joint disease caused by painful osteoarthritis or traumatic injury, a history of unsuccessful surgical procedures or poor bone density that precludes other types of knee surgery. People who may not be eligible for a UKA include those with an active or suspected infection in or about the knee joint, may have a known sensitivity to device materials, have bone infections or disease that result in an inability to support or fixate the new implant to the bone, have inflammatory arthritis, have major deformities that can affect the knee mechanical axis, have neuromuscular disorders that may compromise motor control and/or stability, have any mental neuromuscular disorder, are obese, have lost a severe amount of bone from the shin (tibia) or have severe tibial deformities, have recurring subluxation of the knee joint, have untreated damage to the knee cap and thigh bone joint (patellofemoral joint), have untreated damage to the opposite compartment or the same side of the knee not being replaced by a device, and/or have instability of the knee ligaments such that the postoperative stability the UKA would be compromised.

The anterior cruciate ligament (ACL) should be intact, although this is debated by clinicians for people who need a medial compartment replacement. For people needing a lateral compartment replacement, the ACL should be intact and is contraindicated for people with ACL-deficient knees because the lateral component has more motion than the medial compartment.

== History and physical examination ==
A physical examination and getting the subject's history is performed before getting surgery. A person with pain in one area of the knee may be a candidate for UKA. However, a person with pain in multiple areas of the knee may not be a good candidate for UKA. The doctor may take some radiographs (e.g., x-rays) to check for degeneration of the other knee compartments and evaluate the knee. The physical exam may also include special tests designed to test the ligaments of the knee and other anatomical structures. Most likely, the surgeon will decide to do a UKA during surgery where he/she can directly see the status of the other compartments.

== Surgical information ==
The surgeon may choose which type of incision and implant to use for the subject's knee. During the surgery, the surgeon may align the instruments to determine the amount of bone to remove. The surgeon removes bone from the (tibia) and thigh bone (femur). The surgeon may decide to check if the appropriate amount of bone was removed during the surgery. In order to make sure that the proper size implant is used, a surgeon may choose to use a temporary trial. After making sure the proper size implant is selected, the surgeon will put the implant on the ends of the bone and secure it with pegs. Finally, the surgeon will close the wound with sutures.

The unicompartmental replacement is a minimally invasive option for people whose arthritis is isolated to either the medial or the lateral compartment. The procedure offers several benefits for patients with a moderately active lifestyle, who have arthritis in just one knee compartment, and who are within normal weight ranges. The surgeon uses an incision of just 3-4 inches; a total knee replacement typically requires an incision of 8-12 inches. The partial replacement does not disrupt the knee cap, which makes for a shorter rehabilitation period. A partial replacement also causes minimal blood loss during the procedure, and results in considerably less post-operative pain. The hospitalization time compared with a total knee replacement is also greatly reduced.

== Benefits ==
The potential benefits of UKA include a smaller incision because the UKA implants are smaller than the total knee replacements, and the surgeon may make a smaller incision. This may lead to a smaller scar. Another potential benefit is less post-operative pain because less bone is removed. Also, a quicker operation and shorter recovery period may be a result of less bone being removed during the operation and the soft tissue may sustain less trauma. Also, the rehabilitation process may be more progressive. More specific benefits of UKA are that it may improve range of motion, reduce blood loss during surgery, reduce the person's time spent in the hospital, and decrease costs.

In 2018, two of the most significant benefits of UKA or partial knee replacements are: 1. Partial knee replacement subjects report that their replaced knee feels more like their original non-replaced knee as compared to a total knee replacement 2, Partial knee replacements leave other options open to further advances. By not replacing the rest of the knee with metal and plastic, if other options exist in years to come for arthritis in these areas then a partial knee replacement does not burn that bridge.

== Risks ==
Blood clots (also known as deep vein thrombosis) are a common complication after surgery. However, a doctor may prescribe certain medications to help prevent blood clots. Infection may occur after surgery. However, antibiotics may be prescribed by a doctor to help prevent infections. Individual factors (e.g., anatomy, weight, prior medical history, prior joint surgeries) should be addressed with the surgery subject. The causes of long-term failure of UKAs include polyethylene wear, loosening of the implant, and degeneration of the adjacent knee compartment.

== Long-term results ==
Long-term studies reported excellent outcomes for UKA, partly due to subject screening, minimizing the amount of bone that is removed, and using the proper surgical technique. One study found that at a minimum of 10 years follow up time after the initial surgery, the overall survival rate of the implant was 96%. Also, 92% of the people in this study had excellent or good outcome. Another study, reported that at 15 years follow up time after the initial surgery, the overall rate of the implant was 93% and 91% of these people reported good or excellent outcomes.
