= Stem cell transplantation for articular cartilage repair =

Medical procedure

Mesenchymal stem cells (MSCs) are multipotent cells found in multiple human adult tissues, including bone marrow, synovial tissues, and adipose tissues. Since they are derived from the mesoderm, they have been shown to differentiate into bone, cartilage, muscle, and adipose tissue. MSCs from embryonic sources have shown promise scientifically while creating significant controversy. As a result, many researchers have focused on adult stem cells, or stem cells isolated from adult humans that can be transplanted into damaged tissue.

Because of their multi-potent capabilities, mesenchymal stem cell (MSC) lineages have been used successfully in animal models to regenerate articular cartilage and in human models to regenerate bone. Recent research demonstrates that articular cartilage may be able to be repaired via the percutaneous introduction of mesenchymal stem cells (MSC's).

Stem cells, as a concept, originated as a theory in the 19th century to potentially allow certain tissues to self-renew. There are five types of stem cells, and MSC's are multi-potent, meaning they are cells that have the ability to develop into more than one type of specialized cell. Mesenchymal stem cells were originally discovered and studied as fibroblast-colony-forming cells in guinea-pig bone marrow and spleen cells by Friedenstein in the 1970s. This study proved that the colony-forming units of bone marrow-derived stem cells were able to form cartilage once they were transplanted into a diffusion chamber. The results of this study set the stage for future research by indicating the differentiation capacity of MSC's.

== Current research ==
Research into MSC's has exploded in recent years. As an example, a PubMed search for the year 1999 reveals about 90 papers published under the MESH heading "Mesenchymal Stem Cells", the same search ran for the year 2007 reveals more than 4,000 entries. The most commonly used source of MSC's is bone marrow aspirate. Most of the adult bone marrow consists of blood cells in various stages of differentiation. These marrow components can be divided into plasma, red blood cells, platelets, and nucleated cells. The adult stem cell fraction is present in the nucleated cells of the marrow. Most of these cells are CD34+ heme progenitors (destined to differentiate into blood components), while very few are actually MSC's capable of differentiating into bone, cartilage, or muscle. As a result, that leaves a very small number of MSC's in the marrow as cells capable of differentiating into tissues of interest to joint preservation. Of note, this may be one of the reasons that commercially available centrifuge systems that concentrate marrow nucleated cells have not shown as much promise in animal research for cartilage repair as have approaches where MSC's are expanded in culture to greater numbers.

== Mesenchymal stem cell applications ==
Marrow-nucleated cells are used every day in regenerative orthopedics. The knee microfracture surgery technique relies on the release of these cells into a cartilage lesion to initiate fibrocartilage repair in osteochondral defects. In addition, this cell population has also been shown to assist in the repair of non-union fractures. For this application, bedside centrifugation is commonly used. Again, these techniques produce a very dilute MSC population, usually a yield of 1 in 10,000–1,000,000 of the nucleated cells. Despite this low number of MSC's, isolated bone marrow nucleated cells implanted into degenerated human peripheral joints have shown some promise for joint repair. As the number of MSC's that can be isolated from bone marrow is fairly limited, most research in cartilage regeneration has focused on the use of culture-expanded cells. This method can expand cell numbers by 100–10,000 fold over several weeks. Once these MSCs are ready for re-implantation, they are usually transferred with growth factors to allow for continued cell growth and engraftment to the damaged tissue. At some point, a signal is introduced (either in culture or after transplant to the damaged tissue) for the cells to differentiate into the end tissue

== Recent developments ==
Until recently, the use of cultured mesenchymal stem cells to regenerate cartilage has been primarily in research with animal models. There are now, however, two published case reports of the above technique being used to successfully regenerate articular and meniscus cartilage in human knees. This technique has yet to be shown effective in a study involving a larger group of patients; however, the same team of researchers has published a large safety study (n = 227) showing fewer complications than would normally be associated with surgical procedures.

Another team used a similar technique for cell extraction and ex vivo expansion, but cells were embedded within a collagen gel before being surgically re-implanted. They reported a case study in which a full-thickness defect in the articular cartilage of a human knee was successfully repaired.

While the use of cultured mesenchymal stem cells has shown promising results, a more recent study using uncultured MSC's has resulted in full-thickness, histologically confirmed hyaline cartilage regrowth. Researchers evaluated the quality of the repaired knee cartilage after arthroscopic microdrilling (also microfracture) surgery followed by post-operative injections of autologous peripheral blood progenitor cells (PBPC) in combination with hyaluronic acid (HA).
