= Microfracture surgery =

Cartilage repair technique

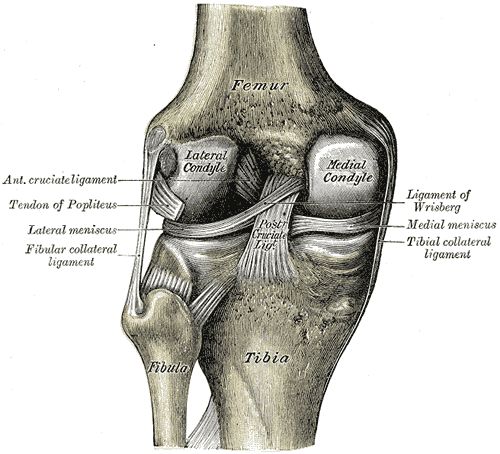
- Left knee-joint from behind, showing interior ligaments. (Lateral meniscus and medial meniscus are cartilage.)
- Specialty: Orthopedic

Microfracture surgery is an articular cartilage repair surgical technique that works by creating tiny fractures in the underlying bone. This causes new cartilage to develop from a so-called super-clot.

The surgery is quick (typically lasting between 30 and 90 minutes), minimally invasive, and can have a significantly shorter recovery time than an arthroplasty (knee replacement).

Chronic articular cartilage defects do not heal spontaneously. However, acute traumatic osteochondral lesions or surgically created lesions extending into subchondral bone, e.g. by Pridie drilling, spongialization abrasion or microfracture causing the release of multipotent mesenchymal stem cells from the bone marrow, may heal with repair tissue consisting of fibrous tissue, fibrocartilage or hyaline-like cartilage. The quality of the repair tissue after these "bone marrow stimulating techniques" depends on the species and age of the individual, the size and localization of the articular cartilage defect, the surgical technique, e.g., how the subchondral bone plate is treated, and the postoperative rehabilitation protocol.

According to a 2017 article in the Journal of Orthopaedics, "Studies have shown that microfracture techniques do not fill in the chondral defect fully, and it forms fibro cartilage rather than hyaline cartilage. The microfracture techniques became controversial due to a lack of favourable reports on the long-term effects."

== History ==
The surgery was developed in the late 1980s and early 1990s by Dr. Richard Steadman of the Steadman-Hawkins clinic in Vail, Colorado. Steadman slowly refined the procedure through research (including tests on horses). The surgery was called "controversial" by many sportswriters, due to a lack of studies on the long-term effects and the fact that an unsuccessful surgery could end an athlete's career. Steadman has also adapted the surgery into a treatment to help reattach torn ligaments (a technique he calls the "healing response").

== Procedure ==
The surgery is performed by arthroscopy, after the joint is cleaned of calcified cartilage. Through use of an awl, the surgeon creates tiny fractures in the subchondral bone plate. Blood and bone marrow (which contains stem cells) seep out of the fractures, creating a blood clot that releases cartilage-building cells. The microfractures are treated as an injury by the body, which is why the surgery results in new, replacement cartilage. The procedure is less effective in treating older patients, overweight patients, or a cartilage lesion larger than 2.5 cm. Further on, chances are high that after only 1 or 2 years of the surgery symptoms start to return as the fibrocartilage wears away, forcing the patient to reengage in articular cartilage repair.

The effectiveness of cartilage growth after microfracture surgery is thought to be dependent on the patient's bone marrow stem cell population and some think increasing the number of stem cells increases the chances of success. A couple of physicians are promoting an alternative treatment implanting autologous mesenchymal stem cells directly into the cartilage defect, without having to penetrate the subchondral bone.

== Microfracture reports ==
Studies have shown that microfracture techniques do not fill in the chondral defect fully, forming fibrocartilage rather than hyaline cartilage. Fibrocartilage is not as mechanically sound as hyaline cartilage; it is much denser and unable to withstand the demands of everyday activities as well as the original cartilage and is thus at higher risk of breaking down. The blood clot is very delicate after surgery and needs to be protected. In terms of time, the clot takes about 8 to 15 weeks for conversion to fibrous tissue and is usually fibrocartilage by about four months post surgery, holding implications for the rehabilitation.

Chondrocyte implantation procedures (CCI), a cell-based articular cartilage repair procedure that aims to provide complete hyaline repair tissues for articular cartilage repair, have been posed by some as an alternative to microfracture surgery. In February 2008, Saris et al. published a large-scale study claiming that CCI results in better structural repair for symptomatic cartilage defects of the knee than microfracture surgery. According to the study, one year after treatment, the regenerated tissue associated with CCI is of better quality than that of microfracture surgery.

== Use in professional sports ==
Many notable professional athletes have undergone the procedure. Partially because of the high level of stress placed on the knees by these athletes, the surgery is not a panacea and results have been mixed. Many players' careers effectively end despite the surgery. However, some players such as Jason Kidd, Steve Yzerman, John Stockton, Kenyon Martin and Zach Randolph have been able to return at or near their pre-surgery form while players Ron Harper, Brian Grant, Chris Webber, Allan Houston, Penny Hardaway, Grady Sizemore, and the late Derek Smith never regained their old form. Others such as Jamal Mashburn and Terrell Brandon never recovered and retired.

Portland Trail Blazers rookie Greg Oden underwent the procedure on his right knee in early September 2007 and missed the entire 2007–2008 NBA season. At only 19 at the time of the surgery, doctors were confident that he would return to at or near his full strength by the 2008–2009 season; he had a second microfracture surgery, this time on his left knee, in November 2010. Subsequently, Oden did not play in the NBA for over four years, missing the entirety of the 2011–2012 and 2012–2013 NBA seasons. The former San Antonio Spurs and Houston Rockets player, Tracy McGrady also underwent microfracture surgery; doctors were confident that the two-time scoring champion would return to full strength. In 2012 he did had the same speed and jumping ability prior to the procedure. McGrady retired in 2013, never regaining his previous form after the surgery.

In October 2005, young star Amar'e Stoudemire of the NBA's Phoenix Suns underwent one of the highest-profile microfracture surgeries to date. He returned to the court in March 2006 and initially appeared to have made a full recovery, but subsequently started feeling stiffness in both knees (his right knee had been overcompensating for the injured left knee). He and the team doctor decided he needed more time to rehab and he did not return until the 2006–2007 NBA season. During the 2006–2007 season, Stoudemire returned to form, averaging 20.4 points and 9.6 rebounds per game while playing in all 82 regular-season games and the 2007 NBA All-Star Game. His success brought positive publicity to the procedure, further distancing it from a previous reputation as a possible "career death sentence" in the sports world, though he was one of the youngest of the aforementioned players to undergo the surgery.

In June 2010, Grady Sizemore of the Cleveland Indians underwent microfracture surgery after injuring his left knee while diving back to first base earlier in the season. Sizemore was re-activated as the Indians center fielder in April 2011, ending an 11-month stretch of being disabled due to his injury. In his first game back on April 17, 2011, Sizemore showed no signs of slowing down as he had two hits in four AB which included a double and home run. Sizemore was the first player in MLB history to come back from knee microfracture surgery and play center field.

Terrell Davis is one of the only notable football players that have the procedure done as well.

== Recovery ==
One study has shown a success rate of 75 to 80 percent among patients 45 years of age or younger.

It is an outpatient procedure and causes only small discomfort. The harder part is the restrictions that are placed on the patient during the post-operative recovery period. This can be a major challenge for many patients. For optimal re-growth of joint surface, the patients need to be very patient and also extremely cooperative. They usually need to be on crutches for four to six weeks (sometimes longer). Sometimes a brace is needed. This depends on the size and/or location of the joint surface defect that is being repaired or regenerated. The patients are encouraged to spend approximately 6–8 hours a day on a continuous passive motion (CPM) machine that helps with optimal re-growth of joint surface. The procedure can be painless for some patients to the extent that the patients avoid these critically important steps and expose the knee to physical activity before the joint fully heals. However, with other patients the procedure can be very painful for weeks even months. Pain medication may be required to manage pain levels in those patients.

Steadman cites the significance of a patient's natural joint alignment in addition to disciplined rehabilitation in recovery from the procedure.
