= Continuous passive motion =

Medical rehabilitation procedure

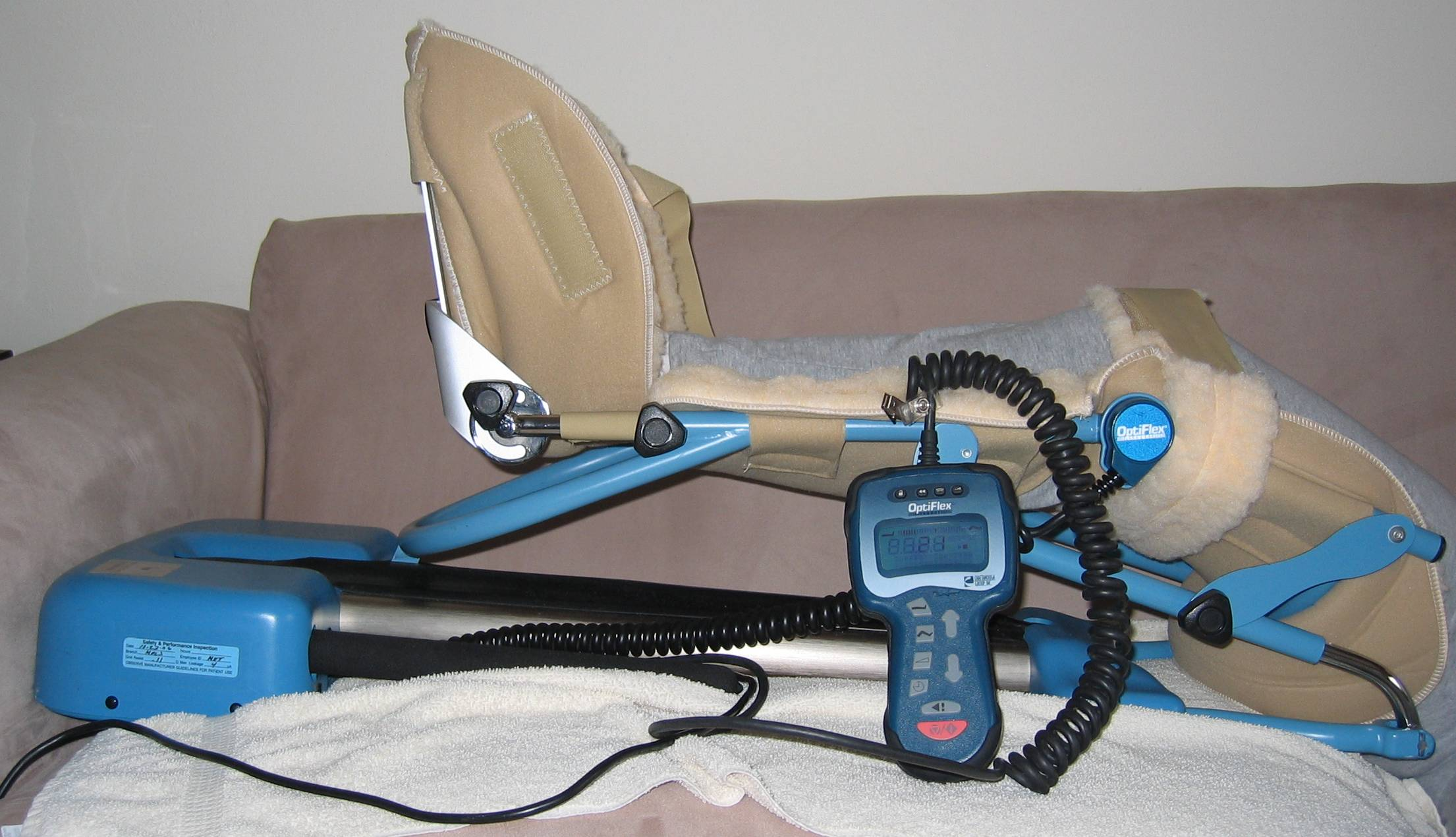
- A continuous passive motion machine for knee joint recovery
- [edit on Wikidata]

Continuous passive motion (CPM) devices are used during the first phase of rehabilitation following a soft tissue surgical procedure or trauma. The goals of phase 1 rehabilitation are: control post-operative pain, reduce inflammation, provide passive motion in a specific plane of movement, and protect the healing repair or tissue. CPM is carried out by a CPM device, which constantly moves the joint through a controlled range of motion; the exact range is dependent upon the joint, but in most cases the range of motion is increased over time.

CPM is used following various types of reconstructive joint surgery such as knee replacement and ACL reconstruction. Its mechanisms of action for aiding joint recovery are dependent upon what surgery is performed. One mechanism is the movement of synovial fluid to allow for better diffusion of nutrients into damaged cartilage, and diffusion of other materials out; such as blood and metabolic waste products. Another mechanism is the prevention of fibrous scar tissue formation in the joint, which tends to decrease the range of motion for a joint. The concept was created by Robert B. Salter M.D in 1970 and, along with help from engineer John Saringer, a device was created in 1978.

== CPM Following Knee Arthroplasty ==
For people who have had total knee replacement without complications, continuous passive motion has been shown to provide clinically relevant benefits. CPM does improve long-term function, long-term knee flexion, knee extension in the short or long term. In unusual cases where the person has problems which prevent standard mobilization treatment, then CPM is found useful.

Although studies in the past have shown a benefit of the use of CPM in those individuals having undergone a TKA, recent research has shown that the benefits are questionable. When groups that only received standard mobilization therapies were compared to groups that received CPM treatment in addition to this same therapy, the results suggest that there is no significant increase in functional outcomes or length of hospital stay, or a decrease in adverse affects related to the surgery. These results weren't adequate for supporting the use of CPM over potentially more successful interventions, such as active exercise that is both high in intensity and velocity. Given the lack of support in current literature, the use of CPM over other treatment is not advised for most patients having undergone a TKA, nor is its use recommended as a standard procedure in clinical practice.

Patient compliance is key to rehabilitation. Furthermore, with patients attempting at-home therapies, must follow orders with proper form

== CPM Following Strokes ==
There are limited occupational therapies that are fully supported across a spectrum of patients. The fundamental movements provided by the CPM units, potentially allows for a remedial and fast progressing therapy. This is according to the University of California. This is an untapped potential for stroke patients that needs to be further explored, according to the same source. CPM units are a rare form of therapy that directly correlates the amount of use to the amount of progress. It is easy to neglect at-home therapeutic exercises for various reasons, but CPMs can be used while watching television or doing anything stationary. This ability to multi-task therapy with recreational activities hold higher promise for patients completing the therapy at home. Completing the therapy at home is just as important as prescribing it. That is why some studies suggest physical and occupational therapy yield better results than CPM units. CPM units should be used supplementary; also, these studies have fully compliant PT and OT patients whereas most patients do not fulfill their at-home exercises as often or with proper form that is suggested in these studies.
