= Robert B. Salter =

Canadian pediatric orthopaedic surgeon (1924–2010)

Robert Bruce Salter
- Born: December 15, 1924; Stratford, Ontario
- Died: May 10, 2010 (aged 85)
- Education: University of Toronto
- Occupations: Orthopedic surgeon, university professor
- Awards: Gairdner Foundation International Award (1969); Order of Canada; Order of Ontario

Robert B. Salter is an orthopedic surgeon and academic.

== Early life ==
He was born in Stratford, Ontario. He graduated in medicine from the University of Toronto in 1947.

== Career ==
He worked for two years at the Grenfell Medical Mission in Newfoundland, and spent one year as the McLaughlin Fellow in Oxford, England. Salter then returned to join the medical staff at the Hospital for Sick Children in Toronto in 1955. He later served as surgeon-in-chief.

Salter developed a procedure to correct congenital dislocation of the hip, pioneered continuous passive motion for the treatment of joint injuries, and co- developed a classification of growth plate injuries in children, commonly known as the Salter–Harris fractures classification system. He developed the supraacetabular innominate osteotomy (i.e. the Salter osteotomy) to treat operatively congenital dislocation of the hip. His textbook of orthopedic surgery, Disorders and Injuries of the Musculoskeletal System, is used throughout the world.

== Recognition ==
He received many awards:

- Officer of the Order of Canada (1977)
- Companion (1997)
- Order of Ontario (1988)
- Canadian Medical Hall of Fame (1995).
- Gairdner Foundation International Award for medical science
- FNG Starr Medal of the Canadian Medical Association
- Bristol-Myers Squibb-Zimmer Award for Distinguished Achievement in Orthopaedic Research.

He was a fellow of the Academy of Science of the Royal Society of Canada

Salter died on May 10, 2010.
