= High tibial osteotomy =

- Specialty: Orthopedic

High tibial osteotomy is an orthopaedic surgical procedure which aims to correct a varus deformation with compartmental osteoarthritis. Since the inception of the procedure, advancements to technique, fixation devices, and a better understanding of patient selection has allowed HTO to become more popular in younger, more active patients hoping to combat arthritis. The idea behind the procedure is to realign the weight-bearing line of the knee. By realigning the knee, the force produced from weight-bearing is shifted from the arthritic, medial compartment to the healthy, lateral compartment. This decrease in force or load in the diseased part of the knee joint decreases knee pain and can delay the development or progression of osteoarthritis in the medial compartment.

== Patient selection ==
The accepted protocol used for patient selection was developed in 2004 by the International Society of Arthroscopy, Knee Surgery, and Orthopedic Sports Medicine (ISAKOS). According to this protocol, an ideal patient is:

- Moderately active
- Between 40 and 60 years old
- Experiencing isolated medial joint line tenderness
- BMI <30
- Malalignment <15°
- Tibia bone varus angle >5°
- Full range of motion in the knee
- Near-normal lateral and patellofemoral compartments without ligamentous instability
- A non-smoker

Contraindications specified by ISAKOS are:

- Patients older than 65
- Severe osteoarthritis of the medial compartment (Ahlback grade III or higher)
- Tricompartmental osteoarthritis
- Patellofemoral osteoarthritis
- Range of motion in the knee <120°
- Flexion contracture >5°
- Diagnosed inflammatory arthritis
- A large area of exposed bone on the tibial or femoral articular surface (> 15x15 mm)
- Heavy smokers

== Surgical technique ==
The general surgical technique includes either performing HTO alone or performing HTO in combination with ligament reconstruction. When deciding which treatment avenue to take, one must consider patient demographics, their predominant symptoms, and which ligaments, if any are involved. When ligaments are involved, but the ACL deficiency is chronic and pain is due to arthritis and malalignment, HTO alone should be sufficient. However, if instability is the predominant symptom, in for example an acute ACL deficiency, HTO in combination with ACL reconstruction may be performed to protect the ACL graft that was constructed.

The two most common surgical techniques used in HTO are lateral close wedge osteotomy and medial open wedge osteotomy.

=== Lateral close wedge osteotomy ===
Starting at the anterolateral aspect about 1 cm below the joint line of the knee, an L-shaped cut is made to the lateral edge of the tibial tubercle and anterior tibial crest. To expose the bone, the fascia of the anterior compartment is cut near the anterior tibial crest and the anterior tibialis is elevated. Osteotomy starts 15 mm below the joint line, just above the tibial tubercle, and is directed parallel to the joint line, medially.

Some of the advantages of the lateral close wedge method are faster healing with less morbidity, greater potential for healing, and no need for bone grafting, unlike the medial open wedge method.

=== Medial open wedge osteotomy ===
The initial cut is made in between the posteromedial border of the tibia and medial aspect of the tibial tubercle. Medial collateral ligament (MCL) is exposed by cutting the sartorius fascia and pulling it medially. MCL is then removed from its insertion medially. Two K-wires are placed towards the lateral cortex, about 4 cm below the joint line. The osteotomy is done below the K-wires and parallel to the joint line.

The advantages of the medial open wedge method include less risk of peroneal nerve injury compared to the lateral close wedge method, no limb shortening, no bone loss, and the use of a single cut with no need to detach muscles.

=== Methods of fixation ===
Two main types of fixation plates are used: spacer plates and plate fixators. Spacer plates are lower profile implants that require a smaller incision. The disadvantage of using a spacer plate is the decreased rigidity associated with increased rates of delayed union or nonunion. Because of this, spacer plates require a longer period of staying off the leg that was operated on. Plate fixators give a stronger fixation, allowing for earlier weight-bearing and initiation of therapy. A couple of studies attempted to compare these two methods but found no differences in reliability.

=== Filling the bone gap ===
After part of the bone is removed, there is a space that may need to be filled. Some prefer using a graft or bone substitute, which will hopefully increase stability and decrease healing time. Bone can also be taken from the hip of the patient to use as a graft. This has a lower complication rate so is considered in someone who is at risk of the bone not healing, like a smoker or obese patient.

=== Complications ===
The most common complications are the same as those occurring for any orthopedic procedure performed on a lower limb. These are:

- Deep venous thrombosis
- Superficial wound infection
- Hematoma

The complications specific to the HTO are rare and include the failure of the bone to heal, common peroneal nerve palsy, decreased ROM, a low lying knee-cap, and a fracture inside the knee joint.
