= Autologous chondrocyte implantation =

Medical treatment for articular cargilage damage

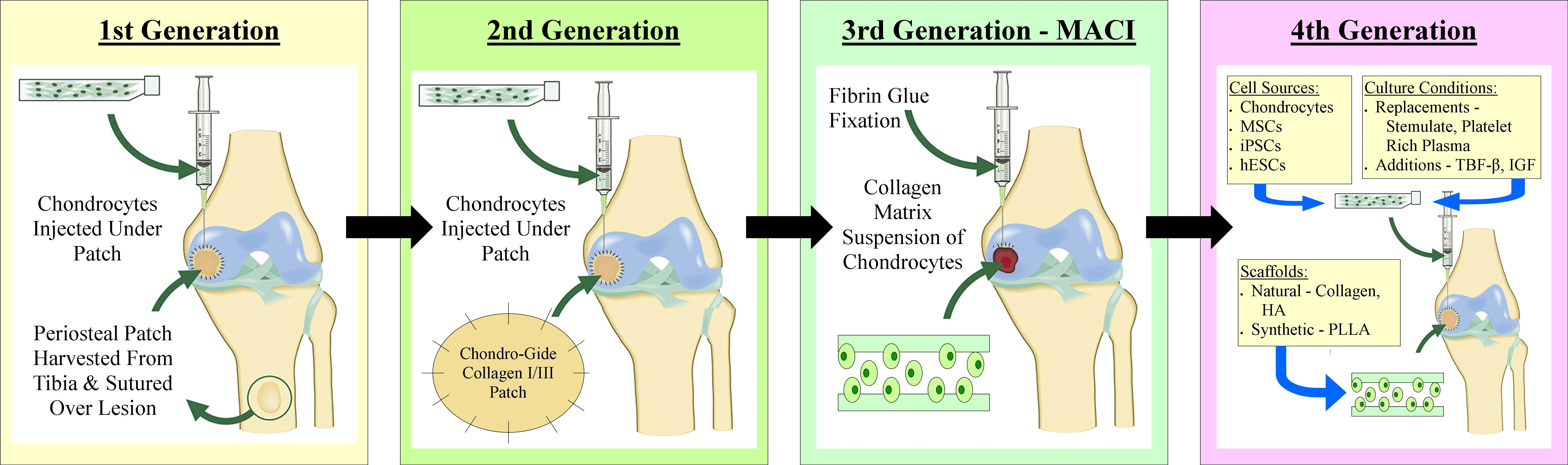
- Autologous Chondrocyte Implantation
- Specialty: Orthopedia

Autologous chondrocyte implantation (ACI, ATC code M09AX02 (WHO)) is a biomedical treatment that repairs damages in articular cartilage. ACI provides pain relief while at the same time slowing down the progression or considerably delaying partial or total joint replacement (knee replacement) surgery.

ACI procedures aim to provide complete hyaline repair tissues for articular cartilage repair. Over the last 20 years, the procedure has become more widespread and it is currently probably the most developed articular cartilage repair technique.

The procedure fails in about 15% of people.

== Matrix Assisted Chondrocyte Implantation ==
In Matrix Assisted Chondrocyte Implantation (MACI), cells are cultured on a bioscaffold which is then implanted. As of 2011 there was insufficient evidence to determine whether it was superior to other treatments.
