= 2p15-16.1 microdeletion syndrome =

- Other names: Monosomy 2p15-p16.1
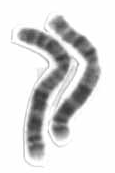
- Chromosome 2(where deletion for this condition occurs)
- Specialty: Medical genetics

2p15-16.1 microdeletion is an extremely rare genetic disorder caused by a small deletion in the short arm of human chromosome 2. First described in two patients in 2007, by 2013 only 21 people have been reported as having the disorder in the medical literature.

== Presentation ==
As of 2013, only 21 patients with a 2p15-16.1 microdeletion had been identified. The clinical similarities between the individuals resulted in the classification of a new genetic syndrome. The shared clinical features include moderate to severe intellectual disability and similar facial features including telecanthus, drooping eyelids, downslanting, short palpebral fissures, a prominent nasal bridge, high palate with long, smooth philtrum and an everted lower lip. Some of the patients also had feeding problems in infancy, microcephaly, optic nerve hypoplasia and hydronephrosis, wide-spaced nipples, short stature, cortical dysplasia, camptodactyly and pigeon toe.

== Cause ==
Human chromosome 2. The short arm where the deletion occurs is to the top

Three of the patients reported had a consistent proximal breakpoint on chromosome 2, but varying distal breakpoints. The patients have 2p15–16.1 deletions of 5.7 megabases (Mb), 4.5 Mb, 3.9 Mb, 3.35Mb 3.3Mb and 570 kilobases, respectively. In all 21 patients the deletions are de novo — neither parent possessed nor transmitted the mutation to the affected individual. One patient is a genetic mosaic, having some cells with the deletion and others without.

=== Affected genes ===
The largest deletion encompasses approximately 15 protein-coding genes, 6 pseudogenes and a number of other as yet uncharacterised candidates, including:

- AHSA2, activator of heat shock 90kDa protein ATPase homolog
- BCL11A, B-cell lymphoma/leukemia 11A
- C2orf74, Uncharacterized protein C2orf74
- FANCL, E3 ubiquitin-protein ligase FANCL
- SANBR, SANT and BTB domain regulator of class switch recombination
- PAPOLG, Poly(A) polymerase gamma
- PEX13, Peroxisomal membrane protein Peroxin-13
- PUS10, Pseudouridylate synthase 10
- REL, C-Rel proto-oncogene protein
- SNORA70B, small nucleolar RNA, H/ACA box 70B
- USP34, Ubiquitin carboxyl-terminal hydrolase 34
- VRK2, Serine/threonine-protein kinase VRK2
- XPO1, Exportin-1
