= List of people with ankylosing spondylitis =

This is a list of notable people, living or dead, accompanied by verifiable source citations associating them with ankylosing spondylitis, either based on their own public statements, or (in the case of dead people only) reported contemporary or posthumous diagnoses. Ankylosing spondylitis (AS) is a type of arthritis in which there is long-term inflammation of the joints of the spine. Typically the joints where the spine joins the pelvis are also affected. Occasionally other joints such as the shoulders or hips are involved.

- John Addey (1920–1982), English astrologer
- Simon Armitage (born 1963), English poet, playwright and novelist
- Mike Atherton (born 1968), broadcaster, journalist and retired England international cricketer
- Reverend William Barber II (born 1963), civil rights activist
- Beau Biden (1969–2015), American politician, lawyer and oldest child of U.S. President Joe Biden
- Rico Brogna (born 1970), former Major League Baseball first baseman
- Karel Čapek (1890–1938), Czech writer
- Jay Chou (born 1979), Taiwanese musician, singer-songwriter, music and film producer, actor and director
- Norman Cousins (1915–1990), American political journalist, author, professor and peace activist
- Talia Dean (1987–), singer-songwriter
- Bruce Furniss (born 1957), American former swimmer
- Andrew George (born 1958), British Liberal Democrat politician
- Bryan Gunn (born 1963), Scottish former professional goalkeeper and football manager
- Franklin Gutiérrez (born 1983), Venezuelan-born Major League Baseball player
- Tanya Harrison, American-Canadian planetary scientist and science communicator
- Edward Hubbard (1937–1989), an English architectural historian who worked with Nikolaus Pevsner in compiling volumes of the Buildings of England
- Lee Hurst (born 1962), English comedian
- Michael King (born 1950), English professional golfer
- Zachary "Zach" Kornfeld (born 1990), best known as one of the Try Guys
- Vladimir Kramnik (born 1975), Russian chess grandmaster and former World Chess Champion
- Paul Kuhr (born 1971), American musician, vocalist, lyricist, author, graphic designer and a founding member of the band Novembers Doom
- Giacomo Leopardi (1798–1837), Italian poet, philosopher and writer; controversial case
- Iain Macleod (1913–1970), British Conservative Party politician and government minister
- Mick Mars (born 1951), former lead guitarist for American heavy metal band Mötley Crüe
- Alannah Myles (born 1958), Canadian singer-songwriter
- Nikolai Ostrovsky (1904–1936), Soviet socialist realist writer, who published his works during the Stalin era
- Joe Perry, snooker player
- Christa Reinig (1926–2008), German writer
- Dan Reynolds (born 1987), lead singer of Grammy award-winning rock group Imagine Dragons, who first revealed that he had the condition at an event in Leeds, UK, in November 2015
- Michael Slater (born 1971), former Australian cricketer
- Chris Small (born 1973), retired Scottish professional snooker player
- Kodi Smit-McPhee (13 June 1996), Australian actor
- William Soutar (1898–1943), Scottish poet
- Jens Stoltenberg (born 1959), Prime Minister of Norway (2000–2001 and 2005–2013) and 13th Secretary General of NATO
- Ed Sullivan (1901–1974), American television personality, sports and entertainment reporter and syndicated columnist
- David Oswald Thomas (1924–2005), Welsh philosopher
- Leonard Trask (1805–1861), whose condition provided the first American description of anklyosing spondylitis
- Dylan Verrechia (born 1976) filmmaker
- Michael Woodhouse (born c. 1965), Minister of Immigration, Police, and Workplace Relations and Safety for New Zealand, and Honorary Life Member of Arthritis New Zealand
- Ian Woosnam (born 1958), Welsh professional golfer
- Jessica Curry (born c. 1973) English videogame music composer
- Joost Zwagerman (1963–2015), Dutch writer
- Michelle Butler Hallett (1971-), Canadian writer
