= BASFI =

Scale assessing patients with AS

The Bath Ankylosing Spondylitis Functional Index was named for the location of the institution (Bath, England) where authors A. Calin and co-workers developed this validated index to determine the degree of functional limitation in patients with the inflammatory autoimmune disease Ankylosing Spondylitis (AS). These researchers recognized that although treatment for AS is focused on pain control and the improvement of function, the available methods of assessing function were not specific to AS and were inadequately validated. In their seminal 1994 publication, Calin and his associates stated that "after pain and stiffness (measured by the BASDAI test), one of the most important complaints of patients with AS is disability."(Calin et al., 1994, p 2281).

The ten questions that comprise the BASFI were chosen with input from patients with AS. The first 8 questions evaluate activities related to functional anatomical limitations due to the course of this inflammatory disease. The final 2 questions evaluate the patients’ ability to cope with everyday life.

== The Questions on the BASFI ==
1. Putting on your socks or tights without help or aids (e.g. sock aids)?
2. Bending forward from the waist to pick up a pen from the floor without an aid?
3. Reaching up to a high shelf without help or aids (e.g. helping hand)?
4. Getting up from an armless chair without using your hands or any other help?
5. Getting up off the floor without any help from lying on your back?
6. Standing unsupported for 10 minutes without discomfort?
7. Climbing 12-15 steps without using a handrail or walking aid (one foot on each step)?
8. Looking over your shoulder without turning your body?
9. Doing physically demanding activities (e.g. physiotherapy exercises, gardening or sports)?
10. Doing a full day activities whether it be at home or work?

A visual analogue scale (with 0 being "easy" and 10 "impossible) is used to answer the questions on the test. The authors stated that this range of scoring improves both the sensitivity of the index to change in the state of the disease and improves the test's capacity to elicit a range of responses across the entire scale (Calin et al., 1994). The mean of the ten scales gives the BASFI score – a value between 0 and 10.
