= Romanus lesion =

Radiologic sign showing erosion of the vertebral endplates

In radiology, a Romanus lesion is the erosion of the anterior and posterior vertebral endplates in patients with an inflammatory spondyloarthropathy – such as ankylosing spondylitis or an enteropathic arthropathy. The anterior erosion in particular causes a loss of anterior vertebral body concavity, causing the vertebra to display a squared contour or even a barrel-shape. Healing of the erosion results in a sclerotic increase in density causing what is known as a shiny corner sign, which can later result in syndesmophyte formation. It is most easily diagnosed using MRI, compared to conventional radiography.

This type of erosion was initially described by Ragnar Romanus and Sven Ydén in a paper published in 1952.
