= Back examination =

Medical examination

A back examination is a portion of a physical examination used to identify potential pathology involving the back.

A spinal assessment is a way to examine the back for potential pathology. Medical inclinometers can be used to assess range of motion. This kind of assessment can help diagnosis scoliosis, kyphosis and degenerative disc disease.

In addition to the general examinations performed on any joint (inspection, palpation, range of motion, and distal pulse, strength, sensation, and reflexes), there are several specialized maneuvers specific to the back examination. These components include:

- Gait
- Straight leg raise
- Waddell's signs
- Schober's test

Evidence from the back examination indicating possible spinal damage may prompt a rectal examination to identify intact tone.
