= Shiny corner sign =

The shiny corner sign is a medical sign which may refer to:

- A small break in a bone, seen with a Thurstan Holland sign
- A location of sclerotic density associated with a Romanus lesion
