= Bernard Connor =

Irish physician & historian (c.1666–1698)

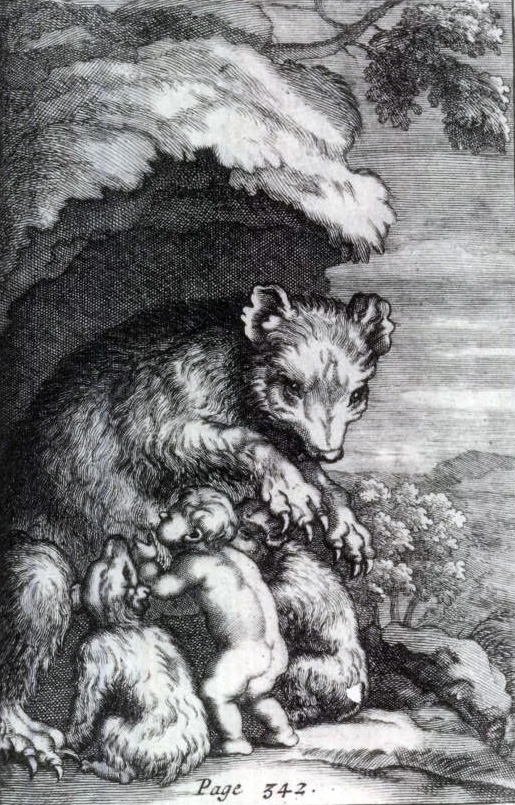
History of Poland

Bernard Connor or O'Connor M.D. (c. 1666–1698) was an Irish physician and historian.

== Life ==
Connor was born in County Kerry in c. 1666, and was instructed by private tutors. With the intention of adopting the medical profession he went to France about 1686, and studied at the universities of Montpelier and Paris, but took the degree of M.D. at Reims on 18 September 1691. He was a distinguished physician, anatomist and chemist.

When the two sons of Jan Wielopolski of Poland were on the point of returning to their own country, it was arranged that they should be accompanied by Connor. He took them to Venice, Padua, and through the Tyrol, Bavaria, and Austria, to Vienna. After some stay at the court of Leopold I, Holy Roman Emperor he passed through Moravia and Silesia to Kraków and Warsaw. He was appointed physician at the court of John III Sobieski; his reputation was increased by his correct diagnosis that Katarzyna Radziwiłłowa, the king's sister, was suffering not from ague as other physicians maintained, but from an abscess in the liver.

In 1694 Connor was appointed to attend the king of Poland's only daughter, the Princess Theresa Kunegunda Sobieska, who was to travel from Warsaw to Brussels to marry Maximilian II Emanuel, Elector of Bavaria. They set out on 11 November 1694, and arrived at Brussels on 12 January 1695. Connor went on in February to London and took up residence in Bow Street, Covent Garden. He visited Oxford, where he lectured on the discoveries of Marcello Malpighi, Lorenzo Bellini, Francesco Redi, and others he had known. He returned in the summer of 1695 to London, where in the ensuing winter he gave another course of lectures. On 27 Nov. 1695 he was elected a fellow of the Royal Society; on 6 April 1696 he was admitted a licentiate of the College of Physicians of London, and that year lectured at Cambridge.

Connor succumbed to a fever, of which he died in October 1698. He was buried at St. Giles's-in-the-Fields on the 30th, when his funeral sermon was preached by William Hayley, D.D. Hayley, who regarded Connor as a member of the Church of England, attended him in his last illness and gave him the sacrament; but a Catholic priest also visited the dying man, and gave him absolution.

== Works ==
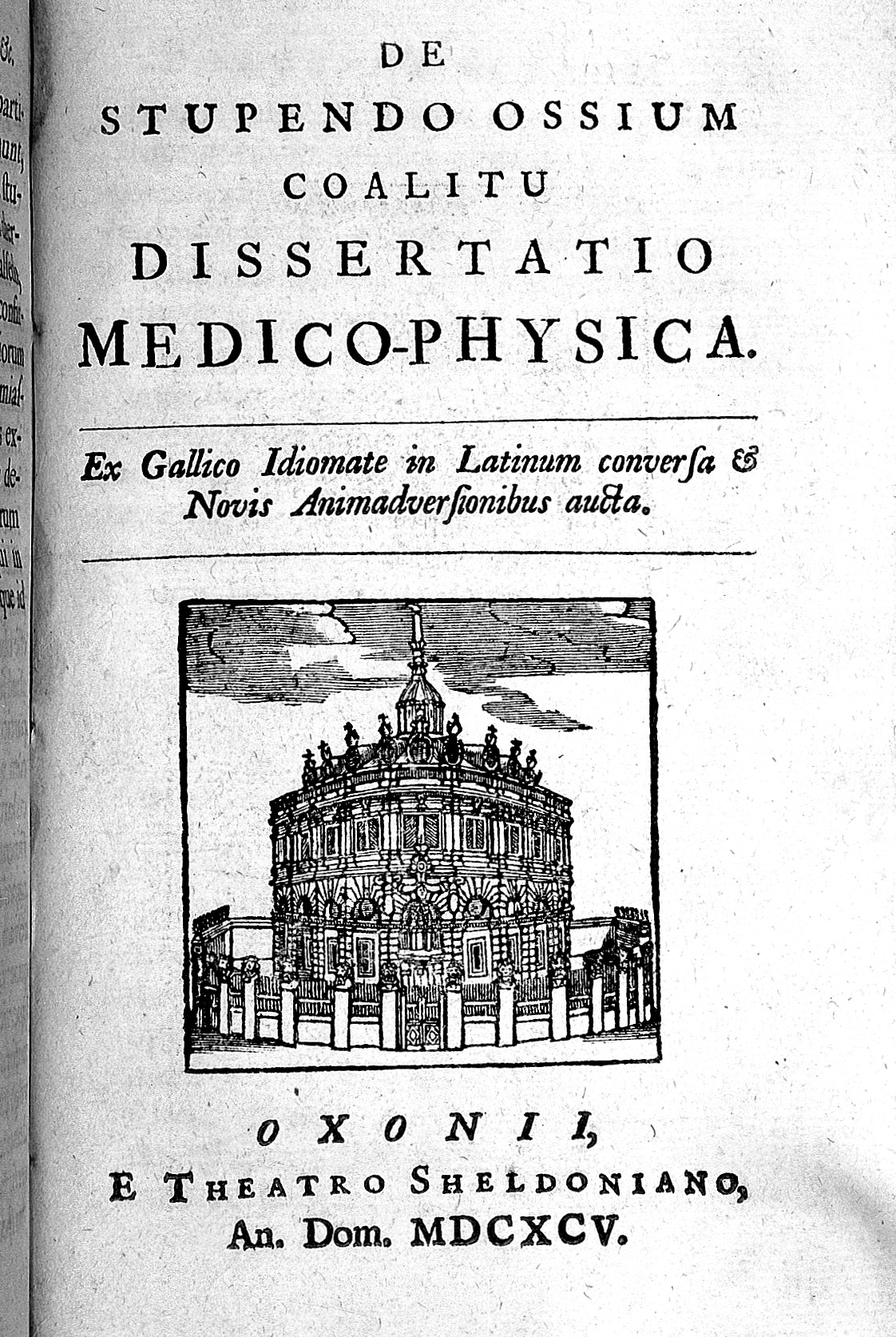
De Stupendo Ossium

In 1695 Connor published Dissertationes Medico-Physicæ. De Antris Lethiferis. De Montis Vesuvii Incendio. De Stupendo Ossium Coalitu. De Immani Hypogastrii Sarcomate Oxford, 1695. These treatises were printed separately with distinct title-pages.

The election of a successor to King John Sobieski prompted Connor's The History of Poland, in several letters to persons of quality, giving an account of the ancient and present state of that kingdom, 2 vols. London, 1698. He was assisted by John Savage, who wrote almost the whole of the second volume. From it the account of Poland in John Harris, Collection of Travels, vol. ii. (1748), was mostly derived.

In 1697 Connor published Evangelium Medici; seu medicina mystica de suspensis naturæ legibus, sive de miraculis; reliquisque en tois bibliois memoratis, quæ medicæ indagini subjici possunt, London, (two editions in the same year), reprinted at Amsterdam 1699. In this work he tried to show that the miraculous cures performed by Jesus Christ and his apostles may be accounted for on natural principles. Its appearance made a sensation, and Connor's religious orthodoxy became suspect.

Other works were:

- Lettre écrite à Monsieur le Chevalier Guillaume de Waldegrave, premier medecin de sa Majesté Britannique. Contenant une Dissertation Physique sur la continuité de plusieurs os, à l'occasion d'une fabrique surprenante d'un tronc de Squelette humain, ou les vertebres, les côtes, l'os Sacrum, & les os des Iles, qui naturellement sont distincts & separez, ne font qu'un seul os continu & inseparable, Paris, 1691. Describes ankylosing spondylitis in a skeleton.
- Zωοθανάσιον θαυμαστόν, seu Mirabilis Viventium Interitus in Charonea Neapolitana Crypta. Dissertatio Physica Romæ in Academia ill. D. Ciampini proposita, Cologne, 1694.
