= David Oswald Thomas =

Welsh philosopher (1924–2005)

- Born: David Oswald Thomas; 4 March 1924; Rhuthun
- Died: 28 May 2005 (aged 81); Aberystwyth

Philosophical work
- Main interests: philosopher
- Notable works: interpreter of the work of Richard Price

David Oswald Thomas (4 March 1924 – 28 May 2005) was a Welsh philosopher, best known as an interpreter of the work of Richard Price.

Thomas was born in Rhuthun, Denbighshire, the son of the Clerk to the Department of Education for the county. He was educated at Denbigh Grammar School, after which he worked as a bank clerk. In 1943, after two years in the bank, he joined the RAF. He served until 1946. Stationed for most of the time in the Middle East, he served one and a half years in Iraq. At the end of his service he took advantage of a scheme for demobilizing into university and studied philosophy at the University College of Wales, Bangor. His student days were marked by the onset of ankylosing spondylitis. After completing his degree, Thomas studied the British idealists for his MA, and then moved from Bangor to London where, for his PhD, he studied the political philosophy of Richard Price. His choice of subject had been influenced by the publication in 1948 of D.D. Raphael's new edition of Price's A Review of the Principal Questions in Morals, first published 190 years earlier. He was successively Tutor in Philosophy and Psychology at Coleg Harlech 1955-60; Lecturer in Philosophy, UCW Aberystwyth 1960-67, Senior Lecturer 1967-79, Reader 1979-83. Throughout his time in Aberystwyth he worked collegiately with Richard Aaron, head of the Philosophy department and specialist on John Locke, and O R Jones who worked in the Philosophy of Mind. In 1965, he married Dr Beryl Jones, with whom he had one daughter, Janet. Thomas died in Aberystwyth on 28 May 2005.

Dr. Thomas made Richard Price, the eighteenth-century Welsh philosopher and polymath, his life's work. In 1977 he published the definitive study of Price, The Honest Mind. This was followed by the complete correspondence of Price, which he produced in collaboration with Bernard Peach of Duke University, and with the assistance of his wife, Beryl Thomas.

Thomas felt that thinkers like Price had received insufficient attention and wished to encourage studies in that area. In 1977, in collaboration with Dr. Martin FitzPatrick, he began the Price-Priestley Newsletter, which in 1982, matured into the journal Enlightenment and Dissent. The journal itself fulfilled his expectations, publishing major articles on eighteenth-century thought including special issues on Samuel Clarke and Enlightenment, Religion, Science and Popular Culture.

Thomas had a special ability to combine philosophical insight with historical understanding. Immune to fashionable trends in the history of philosophy and of ideas, he was critical of the concept of paradigms of thought associated with the work of J. G. A. Pocock. He preferred the notion of traditions, yet was also insistent that traditions of thought should not be viewed as mutually exclusive. His own method enabled him to analyse philosophical problems as they appeared to eighteenth-century writers and at the same time to indicate how those problems might still pose difficulties for us today. His examination of the conflict between Price and Edmund Burke in The Honest Mind is a fine example of his approach. He identified the essential differences between the two thinkers while also demonstrating that Burke's attack on Price was founded, at least in part, on a misunderstanding of Price's political principles.

== Notable works ==
- The honest mind: the thought and work of Richard Price; Oxford, Clarendon Press, 1977.
- The correspondence of Richard Price [with W. Bernard Peach]; 3 vols.; Duke University Press, Durham N.C. & University of Wales Press, Cardiff, 1983-1994.
- A bibliography of the works of Richard Price; Scolar Press, 1993.
- Enlightenment and Dissent (periodical journal)
- Richard Price, 1723-1791; Cardiff, University of Wales Press, 1976. [parallel Welsh & English text]
- Ymateb I chwyldro: barn rhai Cymry blaenllaw ar ddigwyddiadau cychwynnol y Chwyldro Ffrengig = Response to revolution : how the opening events of the French Revolution were perceived by some prominent Welshmen. [text in English]; University of Wales Press, Cardiff, 1989.
- Richard Price and America (1723–91); Aberystwyth, the author, 1975.
