= PEX14 =

Protein-coding gene in humans

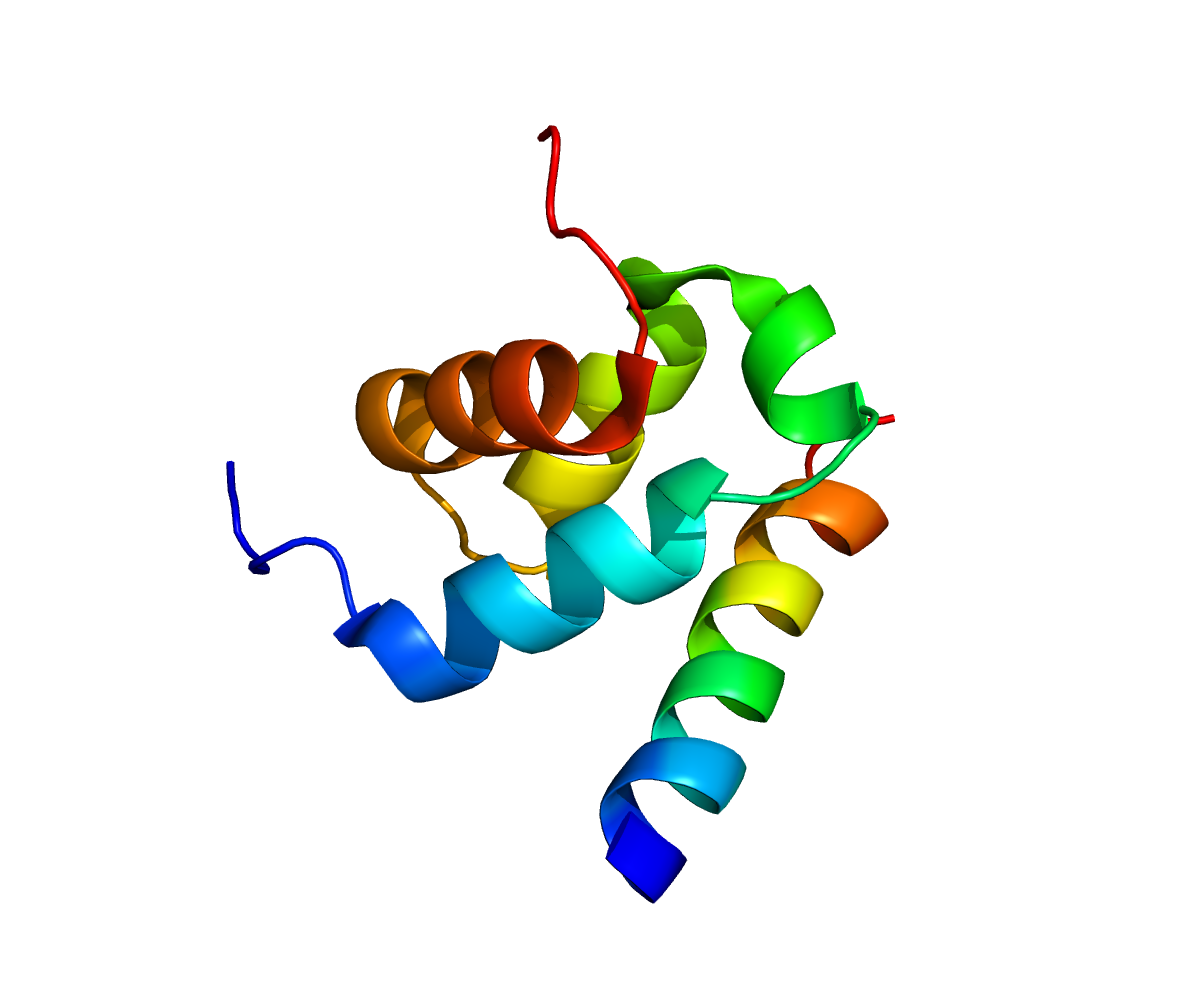

Identifiers
- Aliases: PEX14, NAPP2, PBD13A, Pex14p, dJ734G22.2, peroxisomal biogenesis factor 14
- External IDs: OMIM: 601791; MGI: 1927868; GeneCards: PEX14
Available structures
PDB	Ortholog search: PDBe RCSB
PDB	List of PDB id codes 2W84, 2W85, 4BXU

Gene location (Human)
Chr.	Chromosome 1 (human)
Band	1p36.22	Start	10,472,288 bp
Band	1p36.22	End	10,630,758 bp

Gene location (Mouse)
Chr.	Chromosome 4 (mouse)
Band	4|4 E2	Start	149,044,992 bp
Band	4|4 E2	End	149,184,333 bp
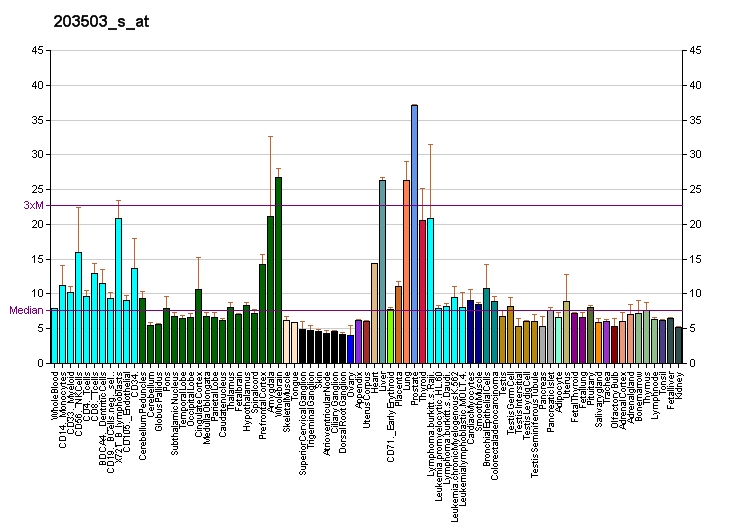

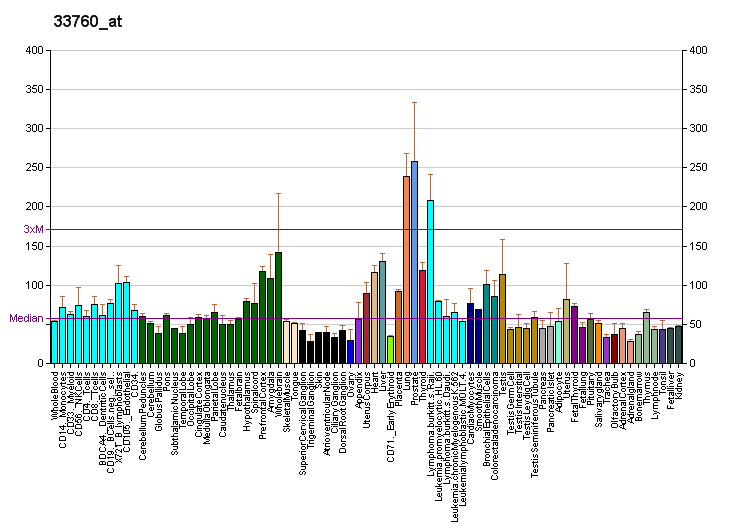
RNA expression pattern
Bgee	Human / Mouse (ortholog); Top expressed in: bronchial epithelial cell; parotid gland; right lobe of liver; pancreatic ductal cell; prefrontal cortex; urinary bladder; muscle of thigh; olfactory zone of nasal mucosa; endothelial cell; oocyte / Top expressed in: otic placode; saccule; otic vesicle; entorhinal cortex; perirhinal cortex; choroid plexus of fourth ventricle; CA3 field; Ileal epithelium; lactiferous gland; yolk sac; More reference expression data
BioGPS	More reference expression data
Gene ontology
Molecular function	transcription corepressor activity; protein N-terminus binding; microtubule binding; protein binding; beta-tubulin binding; signaling receptor binding
Cellular component	integral component of membrane; membrane; peroxisomal membrane; peroxisome; intracellular anatomical structure; nucleus; fibrillar center; peroxisomal importomer complex; protein-containing complex
Biological process	peroxisome organization; negative regulation of protein homotetramerization; peroxisome transport along microtubule; negative regulation of protein binding; negative regulation of DNA-binding transcription factor activity; microtubule anchoring; protein import into peroxisome matrix; protein import into peroxisome matrix, substrate release; protein transport; negative regulation of transcription, DNA-templated; protein homooligomerization; protein import into peroxisome matrix, translocation; transport; protein targeting to peroxisome; protein import into peroxisome matrix, docking; protein ubiquitination; protein-containing complex assembly
Sources:Amigo / QuickGO
Orthologs
Databases	NCBI: entry; OMA: entry
Species	Human	Mouse
Entrez	5195	56273
Ensembl	ENSG00000142655	ENSMUSG00000028975
UniProt	O75381	Q9R0A0
RefSeq (mRNA)	NM_004565	NM_019781
RefSeq (protein)	NP_004556	NP_062755
Location (UCSC)	Chr 1: 10.47 – 10.63 Mb	Chr 4: 149.04 – 149.18 Mb
PubMed search
- Wikidata
View/Edit Human	View/Edit Mouse

Peroxisomal membrane anchor protein (Pex14p) conserved region

Identifiers
- Symbol: Pex14_N
- Pfam: PF04695
- InterPro: IPR006785
Available protein structures:
- PDB: IPR006785 PF04695 (ECOD; PDBsum)
- AlphaFold: IPR006785; PF04695

Peroxisomal membrane protein PEX14 is a protein that in humans is encoded by the PEX14 gene.

== Function ==
This gene encodes an essential component of the peroxisomal import machinery. The protein is integrated into peroxisome membranes with its C-terminus exposed to the cytosol, and interacts with the cytosolic receptor for proteins containing a PTS1 peroxisomal targeting signal. The protein also functions as a transcriptional corepressor and interacts with a histone deacetylase. A mutation in this gene results in one form of Zellweger syndrome.

== Interactions ==
PEX14 has been shown to interact with

- PEX5,
- PEX7, and
- PEX13.
