= Syndesmophyte =

Bony growth originating inside a ligament

A syndesmophyte is a bony growth originating inside a ligament, commonly seen in the ligaments of the spine, specifically the ligaments in the intervertebral joints leading to fusion of vertebrae. Syndesmophytes are pathologically similar to osteophytes. Ankylosing spondylitis patients are particularly prone to developing syndesmophytes. They are also commonly seen in patients who have had back surgery or other chronic stresses on the ligaments of their spine. Syndesmophytes indicate spine degeneration, similar to osteophytes of spine; however, they bridge across the joint as compared to osteophytes which are non-bridging.
