= VRK2 =

Protein-coding gene in the species Homo sapiens

Identifiers
- Aliases: VRK2, vaccinia related kinase 2, VRK serine/threonine kinase 2
- External IDs: OMIM: 602169; MGI: 1917172; GeneCards: VRK2
Available structures
PDB	Ortholog search: PDBe RCSB
PDB	List of PDB id codes 2V62
Enzyme activity
EC #	BRENDA	ExPASy	KEGG	MetaCyc
2.7.11.1	↗	↗	↗	↗

Gene location (Human)
Chr.	Chromosome 2 (human)
Band	2p16.1	Start	57,907,629 bp
Band	2p16.1	End	58,159,920 bp

Gene location (Mouse)
Chr.	Chromosome 11 (mouse)
Band	11|11 A3.3	Start	26,421,322 bp
Band	11|11 A3.3	End	26,543,999 bp
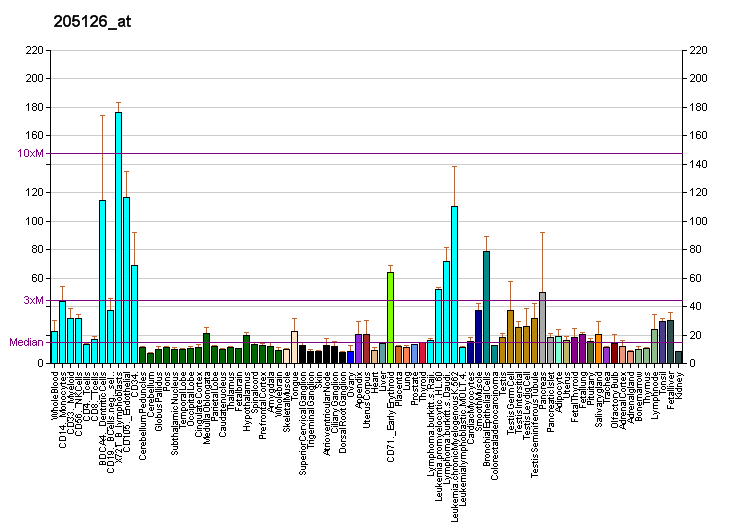
RNA expression pattern
Bgee	Human / Mouse (ortholog); Top expressed in: monocyte; Achilles tendon; gonad; corpus callosum; right ventricle; testicle; islet of Langerhans; epithelium of colon; epithelium of nasopharynx; rectum / Top expressed in: fetal liver hematopoietic progenitor cell; mesenteric lymph nodes; blood; granulocyte; spleen; spermatocyte; thymus; morula; yolk sac; subcutaneous adipose tissue; More reference expression data
BioGPS	More reference expression data
Gene ontology
Molecular function	transferase activity; nucleotide binding; protein kinase activity; protein domain specific binding; kinase activity; protein serine/threonine kinase activity; protein binding; ATP binding; protein kinase binding
Cellular component	cytoplasm; integral component of membrane; endoplasmic reticulum membrane; mitochondrial membranes; membrane; endoplasmic reticulum; mitochondrion; nucleus; protein-containing complex
Biological process	regulation of MAPK cascade; regulation of interleukin-1-mediated signaling pathway; phosphorylation; protein phosphorylation; peptidyl-serine phosphorylation; protein autophosphorylation; cellular response to oxidative stress; viral process; regulation of cell shape; peptidyl-threonine phosphorylation
Sources:Amigo / QuickGO
Orthologs
Databases	NCBI: entry; OMA: entry
Species	Human	Mouse
Entrez	7444	69922
Ensembl	ENSG00000028116	ENSMUSG00000064090
UniProt	Q86Y07	Q8BN21
RefSeq (mRNA)	NM_001130480; NM_001130481; NM_001130482; NM_001130483; NM_001288836 NM_001288837; NM_001288838; NM_001288839; NM_006296	NM_001252447; NM_027260
RefSeq (protein)	NP_001123952; NP_001123953; NP_001123954; NP_001123955; NP_001275765 NP_001275766; NP_001275767; NP_001275768; NP_006287	NP_001239376; NP_081536
Location (UCSC)	Chr 2: 57.91 – 58.16 Mb	Chr 11: 26.42 – 26.54 Mb
PubMed search
- Wikidata
View/Edit Human	View/Edit Mouse

Serine/threonine-protein kinase VRK2 is an enzyme that in humans is encoded by the VRK2 gene.

This gene encodes a member of the vaccinia-related kinase (VRK) family of serine/threonine protein kinases. This gene is widely expressed in human tissues and has increased expression in actively dividing cells, such as those in testis, leukocytes, fetal liver, and carcinomas. Its protein localizes to the endoplasmic reticulum and has been shown to phosphorylate casein and undergo autophosphorylation.

While several transcript variants may exist for this gene, the full-length nature of only one has been biologically validated to date.
