= Schober's test =

Physical examination to measure the ability to flex the lower back

- Purpose: ability to flex lower back

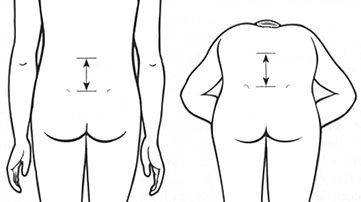
a simple drawing of the measurements to be taken during the Schober Test

Schober's test is a physical examination used in family medicine, physical medicine and rehabilitation, rheumatology to measure the ability of a patient to flex the lower back.

== Procedure ==
While the patient is in a standing position the examiner makes a mark approximately at the level of L5 (fifth lumbar vertebra). Two points are marked: 5 cm below and 10 cm above this point (for a total of 15 cm distance). Then the patient is asked to touch his/her toes while keeping the knees straight. If the distance of the two points do not increase by at least 5 cm (with the total distance greater than 20 cm), then this is a sign of restriction in the lumbar flexion. This can be useful in examining a patient suspected of ankylosing spondylitis.

== History ==
The test was first described in 1937 by Dr Paul Schober (March 11, 1865 - August 22, 1943), a German physician.
