= USP34 =

Protein-coding gene in the species Homo sapiens

Identifiers
- Aliases: USP34, ubiquitin specific peptidase 34
- External IDs: OMIM: 615295; MGI: 109473; GeneCards: USP34
Enzyme activity
EC #	BRENDA	ExPASy	KEGG	MetaCyc
3.4.19.12	↗	↗	↗	↗

Gene location (Human)
Chr.	Chromosome 2 (human)
Band	2p15	Start	61,187,463 bp
Band	2p15	End	61,471,087 bp

Gene location (Mouse)
Chr.	Chromosome 11 (mouse)
Band	11 A3.2|11 14.29 cM	Start	23,256,895 bp
Band	11 A3.2|11 14.29 cM	End	23,440,560 bp
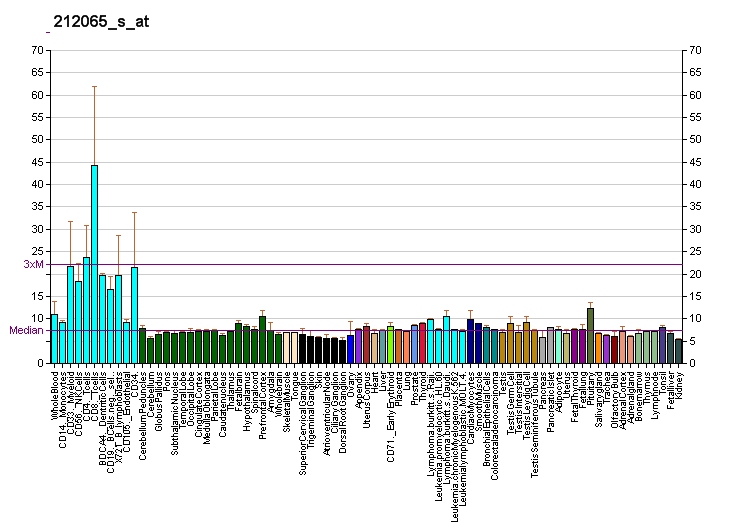

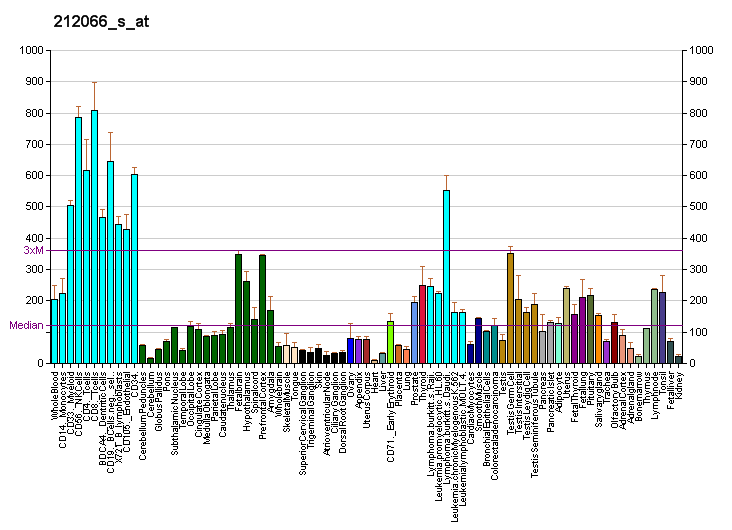

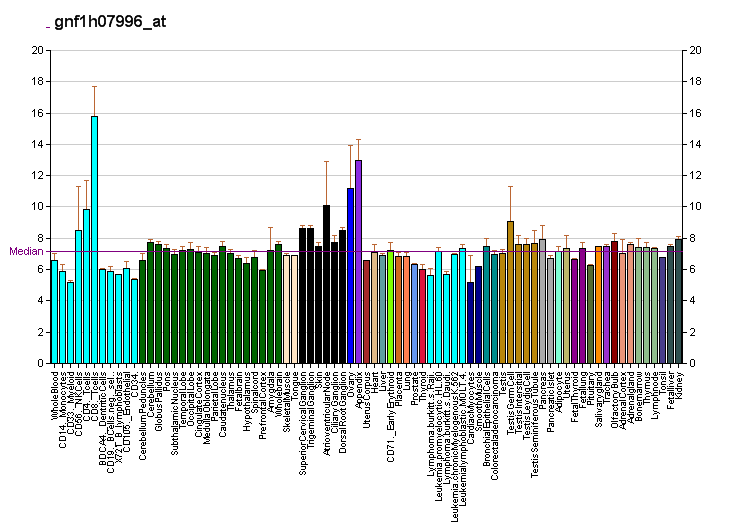
RNA expression pattern
Bgee	Human / Mouse (ortholog); Top expressed in: nipple; renal medulla; cardia; pylorus; ventral tegmental area; trigeminal ganglion; superior surface of tongue; inferior ganglion of vagus nerve; external globus pallidus; sperm / Top expressed in: superior cervical ganglion; conjunctival fornix; barrel cortex; primary oocyte; genital tubercle; vas deferens; tail of embryo; CA3 field; spermatocyte; substantia nigra; More reference expression data
BioGPS	More reference expression data
Gene ontology
Molecular function	protein binding; cysteine-type endopeptidase activity; cysteine-type peptidase activity; peptidase activity; hydrolase activity; thiol-dependent deubiquitinase
Cellular component	cytosol
Biological process	proteolysis; ubiquitin-dependent protein catabolic process; positive regulation of canonical Wnt signaling pathway; protein K48-linked deubiquitination; Wnt signaling pathway; protein deubiquitination; regulation of protein stability
Sources:Amigo / QuickGO
Orthologs
Databases	NCBI: entry; OMA: entry
Species	Human	Mouse
Entrez	9736	17847
Ensembl	ENSG00000115464	ENSMUSG00000056342
UniProt	Q70CQ2	Q6ZQ93
RefSeq (mRNA)	NM_014709	NM_001190401
RefSeq (protein)	NP_055524	NP_001177330
Location (UCSC)	Chr 2: 61.19 – 61.47 Mb	Chr 11: 23.26 – 23.44 Mb
PubMed search
- Wikidata
View/Edit Human	View/Edit Mouse

Ubiquitin carboxyl-terminal hydrolase 34 is an enzyme that in humans is encoded by the USP34 gene.
