= PEX13 =

Protein-coding gene in the species Homo sapiens

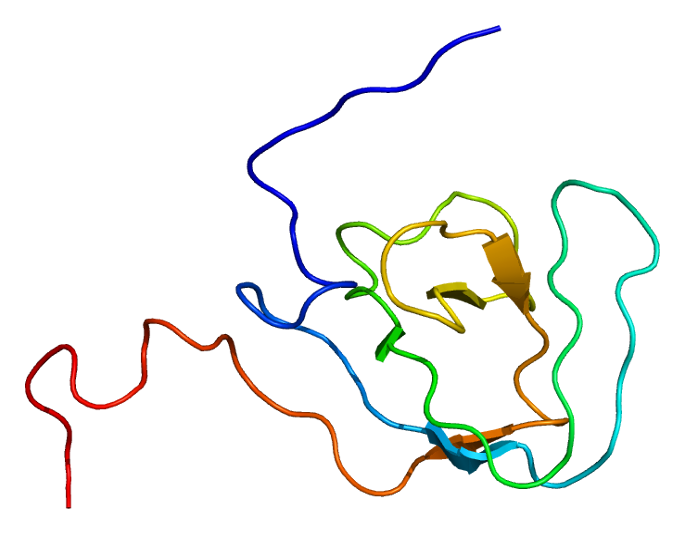

Identifiers
- Aliases: PEX13, NALD, PBD11A, PBD11B, ZWS, peroxisomal biogenesis factor 13
- External IDs: OMIM: 601789; MGI: 1919379; GeneCards: PEX13
Available structures
| PDB | Ortholog search: PDBe RCSB |
| PDB | List of PDB id codes 1WXU |

Gene location (Human)
| Chr. | Chromosome 2 (human) |
| Band | 2p15 | Start | 61,017,225 bp |
| Band | 2p15 | End | 61,051,990 bp |
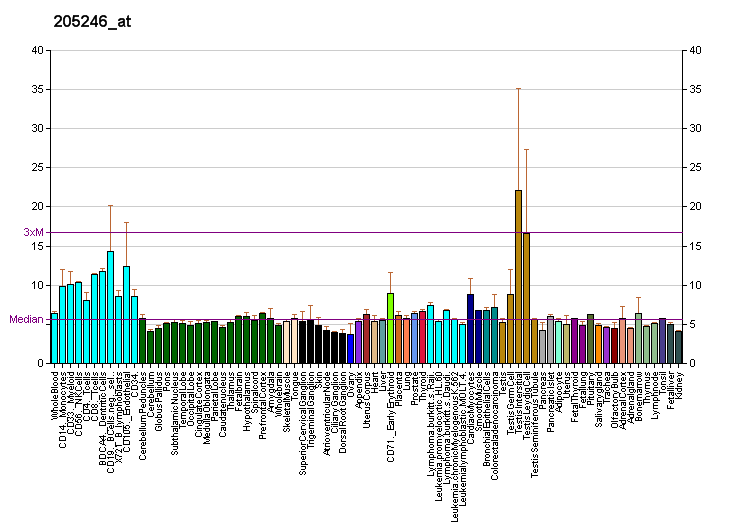
RNA expression pattern
| Bgee | Human / Mouse (ortholog); Top expressed in: secondary oocyte; sperm; buccal mucosa cell; epithelium of nasopharynx; germinal epithelium; visceral pleura; Achilles tendon; gonad; mucosa of paranasal sinus; ventricular zone / n/a; More reference expression data |
| BioGPS | More reference expression data |
Gene ontology
| Molecular function | protein binding |
| Cellular component | peroxisome; peroxisomal membrane; membrane; integral component of peroxisomal membrane; intracellular membrane-bounded organelle; integral component of membrane; peroxisomal importomer complex |
| Biological process | cerebral cortex cell migration; protein transport; suckling behavior; fatty acid alpha-oxidation; microtubule-based peroxisome localization; locomotory behavior; protein import into peroxisome matrix, docking; neuron migration; transport; protein targeting to peroxisome; protein ubiquitination |
Sources:Amigo / QuickGO
Orthologs
| Databases | NCBI: entry; OMA: entry |
| Species | Human | Mouse |
| Entrez | 5194 | 72129 |
| Ensembl | ENSG00000162928 | ENSMUSG00000020283 |
| UniProt | Q92968 | Q9D0K1 |
| RefSeq (mRNA) | NM_002618 | NM_023651 |
| RefSeq (protein) | NP_002609 | NP_076140 |
| Location (UCSC) | Chr 2: 61.02 – 61.05 Mb | n/a |
| PubMed search |
- Wikidata
| View/Edit Human | View/Edit Mouse |

Peroxisomal membrane protein PEX13 is a protein that in humans is encoded by the PEX13 gene. It located on chromosome 2 next to SANBR

== Interactions ==
PEX13 has been shown to interact with PEX14, PEX5 and PEX19.
