= Enteropathic arthropathy =

- Other names: Enteropathic Arthritis
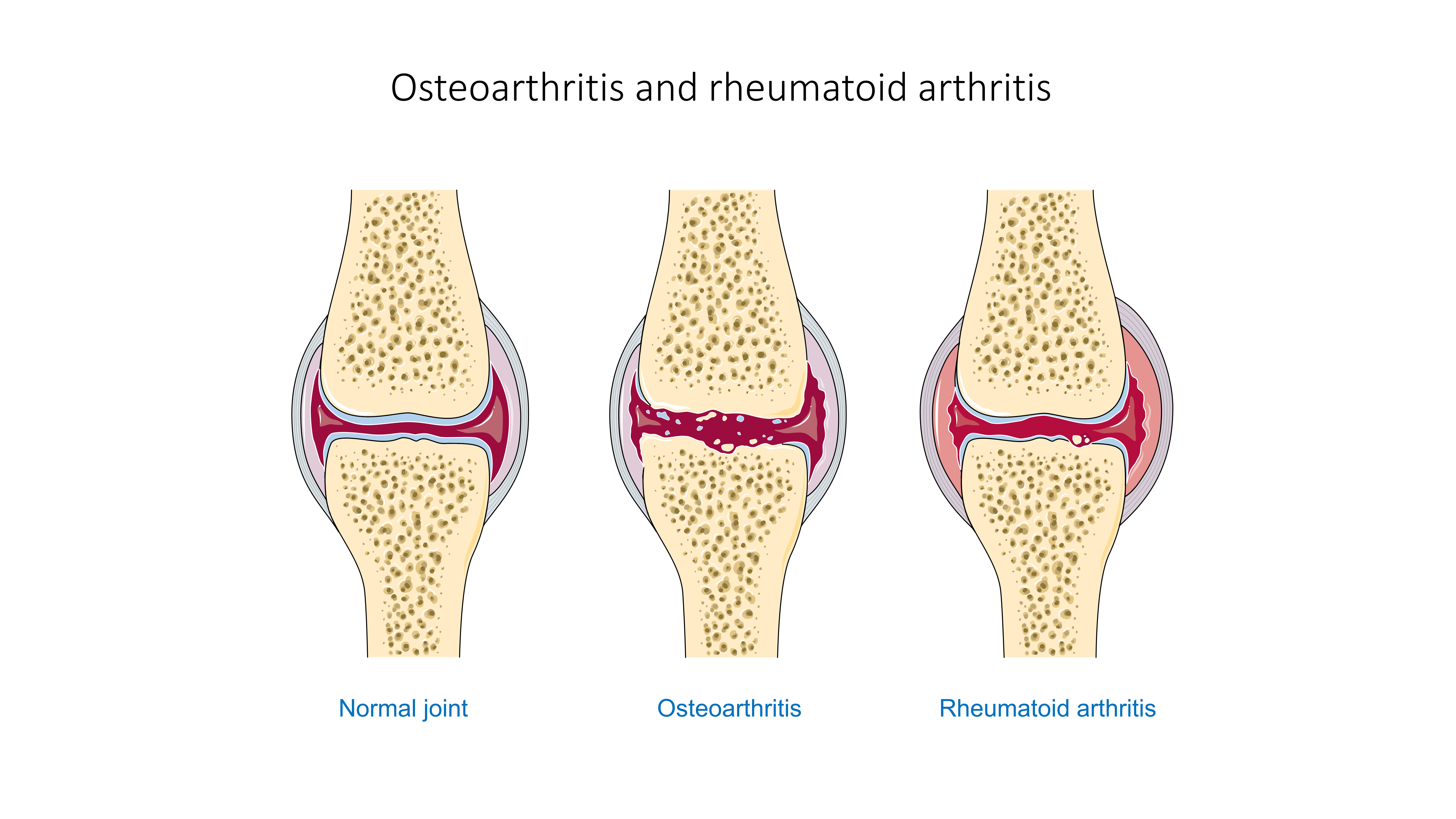
- A comparison of joints in osteoarthritis and rheumatoid arthritis and normal joints
- Pronunciation: /ɛntɹəpæθɪk/ är-ˈthrä-pə-thē
- Specialty: Gastroenterology rheumatology
- Complications: Chronic arthritis, and toxicity of therapy.
- Risk factors: Crohn's disease, ulcerative colitis, inflammatory bowel diseases, Whipple's disease, celiac disease, and intestinal bypass surgery.
- Differential diagnosis: Fibromyalgia, Poncet disease, Reactive arthritis, Bowel–associated dermatosis-arthritis syndrome, Bechet disease, Hypertrophic osteoarthropathy, and SAPHO syndrome.

Enteropathic arthropathy, commonly referred to as enteropathic arthritis, is a type of arthritis linked to Crohn's disease, ulcerative colitis, and chronic inflammatory bowel diseases.

Along with reactive arthritis, psoriatic arthritis, and idiopathic ankylosing spondylitis, this type of arthritis is categorized as a seronegative spondyloarthropathy.

Other gastrointestinal disorders like Whipple's disease, celiac disease, and intestinal bypass surgery for severe obesity can also cause joint involvement. The pathogenesis of arthritis in these conditions is likely influenced by immunologic, genetic, and abnormal bowel permeability factors, though the precise mechanisms are still unknown.

== Signs and symptoms ==
Historically, there have been two main patterns of joint involvement with enteropathic arthritis: axial involvement, which includes sacroiliitis with or without spondylitis resembling idiopathic ankylosing spondylitis, and peripheral arthritis. Additional conditions that may manifest are enthesopathy, tendinitis, and a variety of other conditions such as periostitis, clubbing, and granulomatous lesions of the bone and joint.

Two types of peripheral arthritis have been identified. Pauciarticular arthritis, or type I, usually affects fewer than five major weight-bearing joints. It usually has an asymmetrical pattern and is linked to active bowel disease; monoarthritis isn't uncommon. Both big and small joints are affected, mainly lower limb joints like the metatarsophalangeal joints, ankles, and knees. Shoulder and hip arthritis is less common and is typically linked to spondylitis and sacroiliitis. It does not cause joint deformities, but it is typically migratory, transitory, and recurrent. Joint symptoms, particularly in Crohn's disease, can manifest before bowel symptoms do. In ulcerative colitis, the time of the initial arthritis attack appears to be unrelated to the length of the colitis. Furthermore, a relapse of peripheral arthritis is often associated with a flare-up of the gut symptoms, primarily in ulcerative colitis.

Polyarthritis type II primarily affects the small joints. Rarely does it come before an IBD diagnosis. It usually progresses on its own schedule apart from the bowel illness. Months may pass during an active synovitis episode, and it may recur frequently. Years may pass between periods of exacerbations and remissions.

The spectrum of axial involvement includes true ankylosing spondylitis, which is characterized by classic clinical and radiologic features, as well as asymptomatic sacroiliitis and inflammatory pain in the lower back regardless of the radiological evidence of the condition. Axial involvement may occur years before bowel disease. Inflammatory low back pain, buttocks pain, and chest pain are the main complaints. Typically occurring before the age of 45, inflammatory back pain often begins slowly, is often unilateral, sporadic, and worsens while at rest. It can also be aggravated by coughing or sneezing, worsen in the morning, and cause fatigue. The pain persists for at least three months. Enthesitis of the manubriocostal, costosternal, and costovertebral articulations causes thoracic pain. It worsens with coughing and deep inspirations, and it restricts the expansion of the respiratory system with varying-length episodes. Ankylosing spondylitis has been linked with dactylitis. It is distinguished by tenosynovitis that affects the flexor tendons resulting in inflammatory swelling in one or more fingers or toes. One of the main indicators that the disease is progressing toward generalized ankylosis is the restriction of cervical spine mobility.

== Causes ==
It is unknown what exactly causes the enteropathic arthropathies. Increased permeability from GI tract inflammation can lead to the absorption of antigenic substances, such as bacterial antigens. The musculoskeletal tissues, such as entheses and the synovial membrane, may then localize these arthrogenic antigens, triggering an inflammatory response. Alternatively, by means of molecular mimicry, which involves the host's immune system reacting to these antigens in a cross-reaction with self-antigens present in the synovial membrane and other target organs, an autoimmune response may be triggered.

=== Risk factors ===
Depending on the study population as well as the definitions used, systemic disorders such as inflammatory bowel disease (IBD), Crohn's disease (CD), and ulcerative colitis (UC) may be made worse by extraintestinal manifestations in up to 40% of patients. In IBD, rheumatological manifestations are common and include secondary osteoporosis, secondary hypertrophic osteoarthropathy, axial involvement, peripheral enthesitis, and peripheral arthritis.

Whipple's disease is an uncommon multisystem illness caused by a bacterium called Tropheryma whippelii. Clinical manifestations include dementia, polyarthralgia, low-grade fever, diarrhea, weight loss, lymphadenopathy, and neuropsychiatric symptoms. Arthralgia, as well as arthritis, are the sole signs in 67% of patients, and they may appear years before other symptoms. A case series comprising twenty-five patients with Whipple's disease-related arthropathy revealed that symmetric migratory polyarthritis, primarily affecting the knees, ankles, and wrists, was the most prevalent pattern. Up to 40% of patients have been reported to have axial involvement with lumbar and sacroiliac tenderness. Radiologic signs resembling those of ankylosing spondylitis have also been observed.

Celiac disease is a type of gluten-sensitive enteropathy marked by small intestinal mucosal abnormalities, particularly villous flattening and atrophy, which leads to malabsorption. Among the numerous clinical signs and symptoms of malabsorption are dermatitis herpetiformis, weight loss, diarrhea, and anemia. A link between celiac disease and inflammatory arthritis was first documented in 1982. The most frequently reported articular pattern is polyarticular symmetrical arthritis involving large joints like the knees, hips, and shoulders. There have also been reports of polyarticular small and large joint arthropathy, oligoarthritis, and monoarthritis. Axial and peripheral arthritis are often associated with celiac disease and can sometimes occur in adults and children before or without bowel symptoms.

In an effort to treat morbid obesity, small intestine bypass surgeries first emerged in the 1950s. The goal was to decrease the absorptive surface of the gut. In 20% to 80% of patients, postoperative arthritis-dermatitis syndrome and several metabolic side effects occur. When the jejunoileal bypass was used in place of the jejunocolonic bypass, similar problems still occurred. Though mono- and oligoarthritis have also been reported, the typical clinical presentation is a migratory non-erosive seronegative polyarthritis affecting the ankles, wrists, shoulders, hands, and fingers. Usually, the arthritis appears two to three years following the surgery. Intestinal bypass arthritis has been linked to the overgrowth of bacteria in the blind loop segment of the bowel, and immunologic involvement appears likely due to the presence of immune complexes in the serum. Reversing the bypass surgery is typically linked to a total and permanent remission of the arthritis, providing more proof of the connection between intestines and joint pathology.

== Diagnosis ==
No pathognomonic finding exists to support a diagnosis of IBD-related arthritis. In the appropriate clinical context, a suspicion of the diagnosis may arise. Radiographs of the pelvis and spine may reveal characteristic features of sacroiliitis and ankylosing spondylitis. The latter is usually bilateral, though reports have indicated a higher incidence of zygapophyseal joint ankylosis and asymmetric sacroiliitis. Although erosive lesions, primarily of the metatarsal joints, are reported, radiographic changes are typically not associated with peripheral joint involvement. Certain characteristics of these lesions differ from those of rheumatoid arthritis, such as the absence of osteoporosis as well as the presence of neighboring bone proliferation. Occasionally, a damaging granulomatous synovitis linked to Crohn's disease may be observed. Radiographically, enteropathies are similar to those observed in other spondyloarthritis.

== Treatment ==
Establishing the efficacy of therapy can be challenging in certain patients due to the episodic nature of their arthropathy. Simple interventions like rest, splints, intra-articular steroid injections, and physical therapy are used to treat many patients.

NSAIDs are usually effective in treating spondyloarthropathy patients; however, they should be used cautiously as they may worsen IBD and have been linked to ulcerations in both the large and small intestines.

Controlling intestinal inflammation is the primary treatment objective for peripheral arthritis, as the disease's activity frequently resembles that of bowel disease. For ulcerative colitis, sulfasalazine has been demonstrated to be beneficial in treating flare-ups as well as the underlying condition; however, the picture for Crohn's disease is less clear. Sulfasalazine has been demonstrated to be beneficial in certain trials for Crohn's disease, but not in others.

The development of targeted biological treatments has had an impact on enteropathic arthritis management. Psoriatic arthritis, enthesopathy linked to spondyloarthropathy, and refractory ankylosing spondylitis can all benefit from biological blockade using the TNFa antagonists etanercept and infliximab. Infliximab is also useful in reducing spondyloarthropathy and intestinal inflammation in Crohn's disease patients. Etanercept did not affect bowel disease, but anecdotal evidence points to etanercept's potential benefit in treating spondyloarthritis linked to Crohn's disease, including MRI-demonstrated resolution of spondylitis.

== See also ==
- Enteropathy
- Arthropathy
