= Arthritis mutilans =

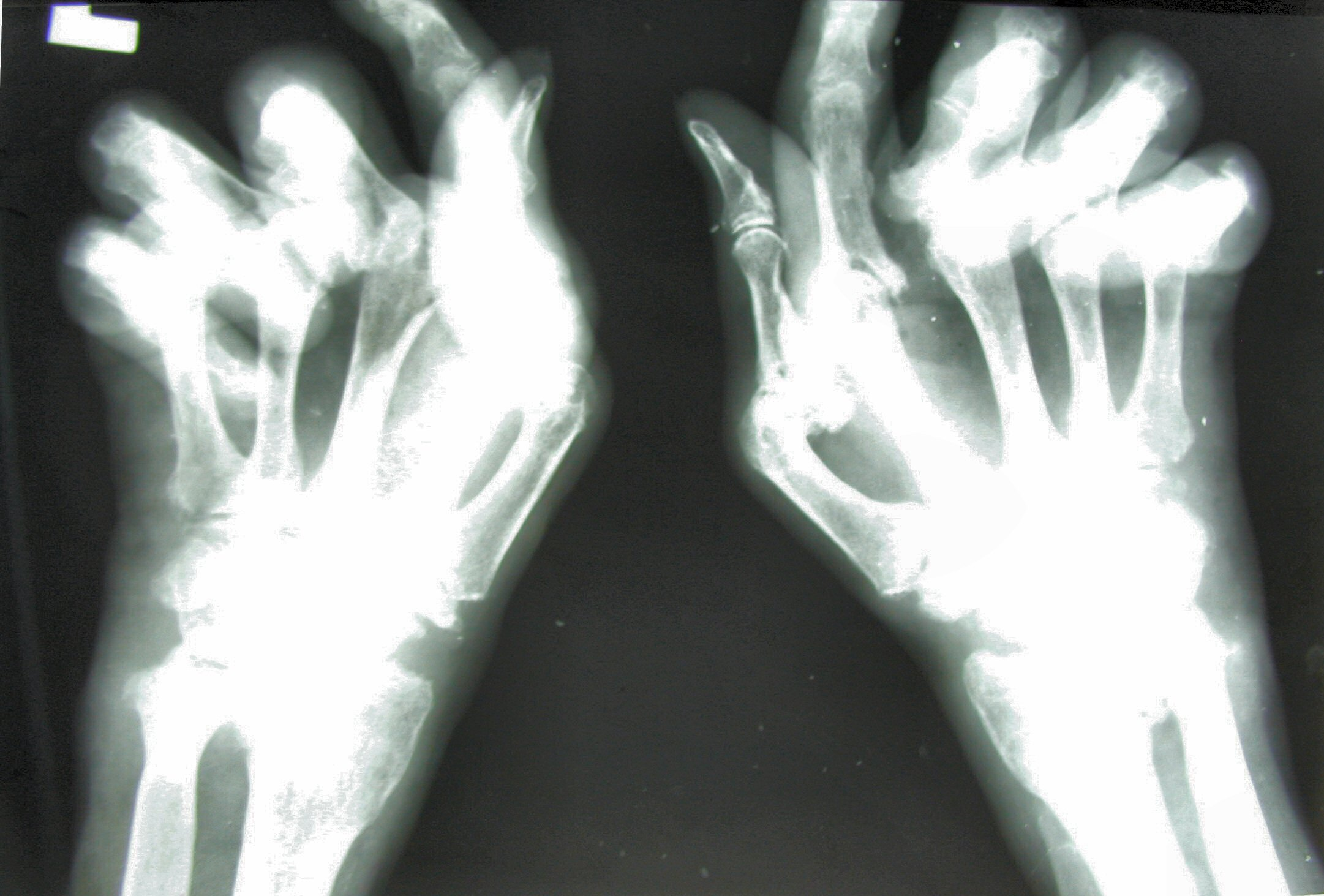
- Specialty: Rheumatology

Arthritis mutilans is a rare medical condition involving severe inflammation damaging the joints of the hands and feet, and resulting in deformation and problems with moving the affected areas; it can also affect the spine. As an uncommon arthropathy, arthritis mutilans was originally described as affecting the hands, feet, fingers, and/or toes, but can refer in general to severe derangement of any joint damaged by arthropathy. First described in modern medical literature by Marie and Leri in 1913, in the hands, arthritis mutilans is also known as opera glass hand (la main en lorgnette in French), or chronic absorptive arthritis. Sometimes there is foot involvement in which toes shorten and on which painful calluses develop in a condition known as opera glass foot, or pied en lorgnette.

== Signs and symptoms ==
For a person with arthritis mutilans in the hands, the fingers become shortened by arthritis, and the shortening may become severe enough that the hand looks paw-like, with the first deformity occurring at the interphalangeal and metacarpophalangeal joints. The excess skin from the shortening of the phalanx bones becomes folded transversely, as if retracted into one another like opera glasses, hence the description la main en lorgnette. As the condition worsens, luxation, phalangeal and metacarpal bone absorption, and skeletal architecture loss in the fingers occurs.

== Cause ==
Arthritis mutilans occurs mainly in people who have pre-existing psoriatic arthritis, but can occur, if less often, in advanced rheumatoid arthritis; it can also occur independently. Psoriasis and psoriatic arthritis are interrelated heritable diseases, occurring with greater heritable frequency than rheumatoid arthritis, primary Sjögren syndrome and thyroid disease. Psoriasis affects 2–3% of the Caucasian population, and psoriatic arthritis affects up to 30% of those. Arthritis mutilans presents in about 5–16% of psoriatic arthritis cases, involves osteolysis of the DIP and PIP joints, and can include bone edema, bone erosions, and new bone growth. Most often psoriatic arthritis is seronegative for rheumatoid factor (occurring in only about 13% of cases), and has genetic risk factor overlap with ankylosing spondylitis with HLA-B27, IL-23R77, and IL-1, however, as of 2016, immunopathogenesis is unclear.

== Diagnosis ==
Enthesitis can assist in differentiating arthritis mutilans' parent condition psoriatic arthritis from rheumatoid arthritis and osteoarthritis, with evidence in plain radiographs (x-rays) and MRI as periostitis, new bone formation, and bone erosions. Dactylitis, spondylitis and sacroiliitis are common with the parent condition psoriatic arthritis, but are not in rheumatoid arthritis. MRI bone edema scores are high in arthritis mutilans and correlate with radiographic measures of joint damage, although they may not correlate with disease activity. A source of significant pain, bone marrow edema (or lesions, using newer terminology), can be detected on MRI or with ultrasonography by signals of excessive water in bone marrow. Specifically, bone marrow edema can be detected within bone on T1-weighted images as poorly defined areas of low signal, with a high signal on T2-weighted fat-suppressed images. Comparatively, with arthritis mutilans in rheumatoid arthritis, bone marrow edema often involves the subchondral bone layer, while the condition as a subtype of psoriatic arthritis includes a greater extent of marrow edema, expanding to diaphysis.

== Treatment ==
=== Medication ===
The bone edema in arthritis mutilans can be treated with TNF inhibitors in the short term: a 2007 study found that the bone edema associated with psoriatic arthritis (of which arthritis mutilans is a subtype) responded to TNF inhibitors with "dramatic" improvement, but the study was not determinative of whether TNF inhibitors would prevent new bone formation, bone fusion, or osteolysis (bone resorption).

=== Surgical ===
Although a 2011 research article stated that disagreements between hand surgeons and rheumatologists remain regarding the indications, timing and effectiveness of rheumatoid hand surgery, arthritis mutilans may be successfully treated by iliac-bone graft and arthrodesis of the interphalangeal joints and the metacarpophalangeal joint in each finger.

== Outcomes ==
Arthritis mutilans' parent condition psoriatic arthritis leaves people with a mortality risk 60% higher than the general population, with premature death causes mirroring those of the general population, cardiovascular issues being most common. Life expectancy for people with psoriatic arthritis is estimated to be reduced by approximately 3 years.
