= Monoarthritis =

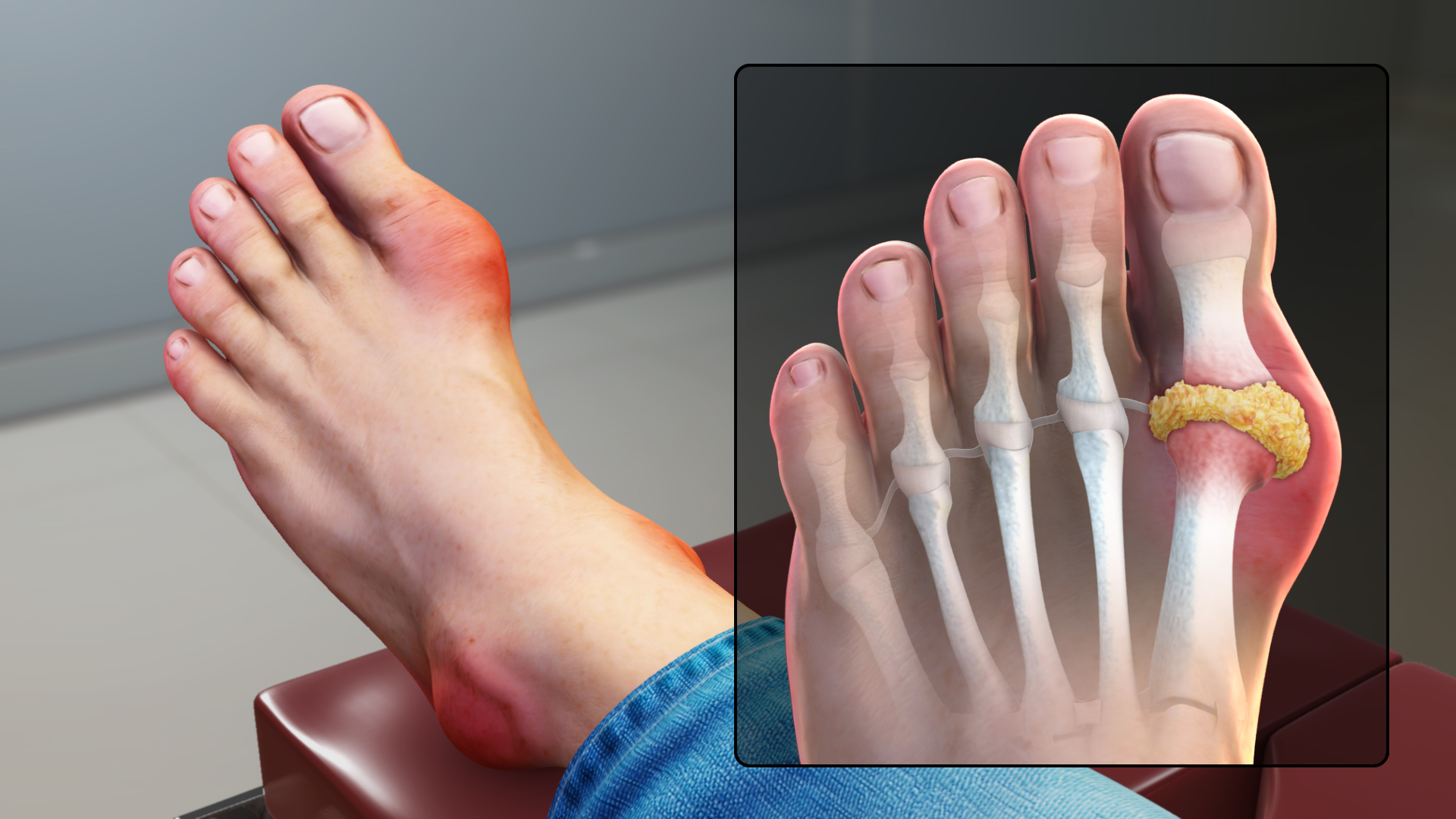
- Toe affected by gout
- Specialty: Rheumatology

Monoarthritis, or monoarticular arthritis, is inflammation (arthritis) of one joint at a time (as opposed to oligoarthritis, which affects 2-4 joints, and polyarthritis, which affects more than 4 joints). It is usually caused by trauma, infection, or crystalline arthritis.

== Causes ==
=== Septic arthritis ===
Septic arthritis is an inflammatory response to an infection (usually bacterial) in the joint. Usually impacting large joints like the hip or the knee, it is a medical emergency treated with oral and intravenous antibiotics as well as joint drainage.

=== Gout ===
Gout is inflammation caused by the deposition of needle-shaped monosodium urate crystals in the joints. It is the most common type of inflammatory arthritis in the United States. The disease typically affects a single joint in earlier stages, but can progress into polyarthritis over time. It usually occurs in extremities or digits, commonly in the big toe.

=== Pseudogout ===
Pseudogout (also referred to as calcium pyrophosphate dihydrate crystal deposition disease) is another type of crystalline arthritis that presents similarly to gout, but is caused by the deposition of rhomboid-shaped calcium pyrophosphate dihydrate crystals. The knees, wrists, and fingers are the most common joints affected by pseudogout.

=== Osteoarthritis ===
Osteoarthritis is a degenerative, or non-inflammatory arthritis. It is the most common type of arthritis, affecting between 19% and 30% of adults above the age of 45. It is caused by a progressive erosion of cartilage which eventually leads to bone damage. It is a polyarthritis, but usually begins in a single joint.

=== Psoriatic arthritis ===
Psoriatic arthritis is an inflammatory arthritis common in people with psoriasis. It often presents as asymmetric oligoarthritis (impacting 2-4 joints) affecting the distal interphalangeal joints, although it can appear in a single joint. Joint-area discoloration, dactylitis, nail changes, and enthesitis, are common symptoms of psoriatic arthritis that distinguish it from other forms of arthritis. Unlike other types of inflammatory arthritis, which typically affect women more than men, psoriatic arthritis has no gender preference.

== Diagnosis ==
X-rays, MRI scans, and other types of imaging can show bone loss and erosion from degenerative arthritis or later stages of inflammatory arthritis. Laboratory testing, specifically microscopic synovial fluid examination, is a more accurate method of diagnosing arthritis. By performing a joint aspiration, physicians can check cell counts and look for signs of infection (bacteria/fungus) or crystal formation to determine which, if any, type of arthritis is present.

== Treatment ==
Monoarthritis is treated the same way as other forms of arthritis. Minimizing pain, preventing disease progression, and improving joint function are the goals of arthritis treatment. Treatment can vary depending on the cause and severity of the condition. Physical therapy and anti-inflammatory drugs are commonly used to treat the disease. In more severe cases, intra-articular corticosteroid injections or surgical joint replacement may be necessary. Joint drainage and antibiotics are used to treat septic arthritis. Medications that decrease uric acid can mitigate chronic gout symptoms.

== See also ==
- Gout
- Pseudogout
- Septic arthritis
- Osteoarthritis
