= Spondyloarthritis =

Joint diseases of the vertebral column

- Other names: Spondyloarthropathy
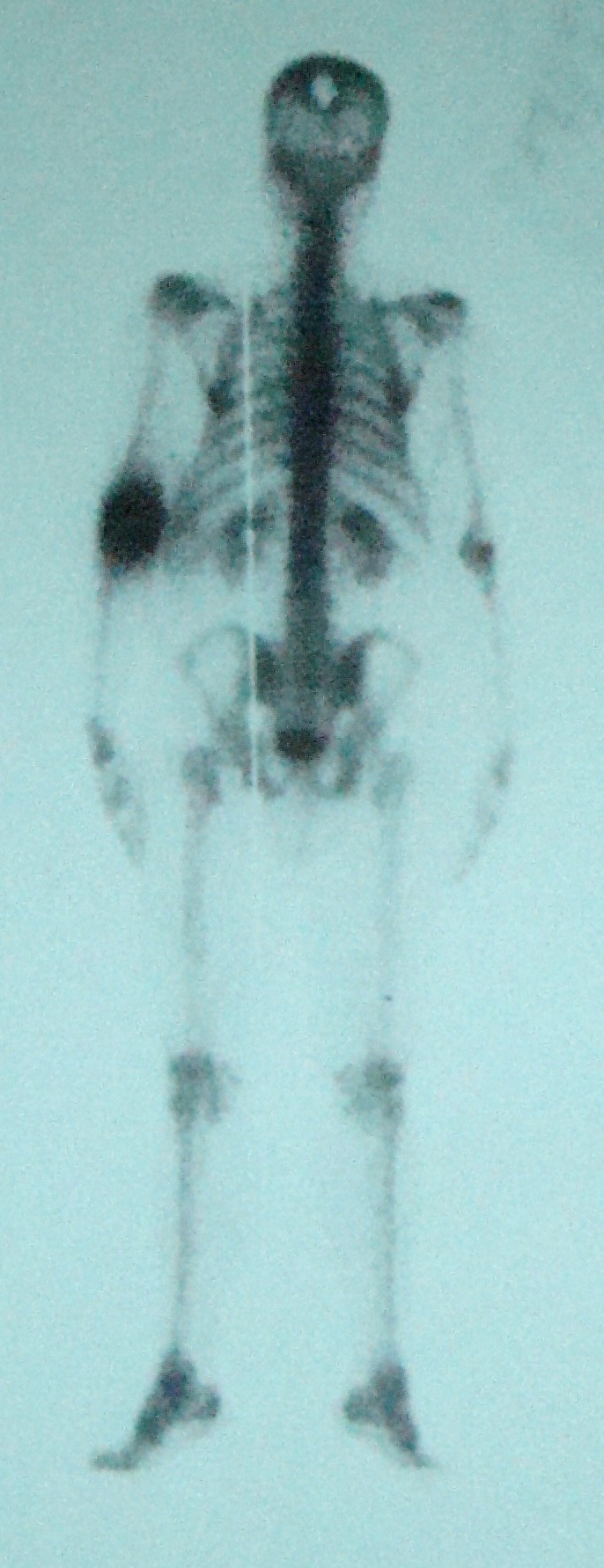
- Bone scintigraphy made with 99mTc demonstrating the highly enhanced tumor borders and the right elbow affected by psoriatic arthritis.
- Specialty: Rheumatology

Spondyloarthritis (SpA), also known as spondyloarthropathy, is a collection of inflammatory rheumatic syndromes connected by genetic predisposition and clinical symptoms. The best-known subtypes are enteropathic arthritis (EA), psoriatic arthritis (PsA), ankylosing spondylitis (AS), and reactive arthritis (ReA). Symptoms of spondyloarthritis include back pain, arthritis, and enthesitis, inflammation at bone-adhering ligaments, tendons, or joint capsules.

Spondyloarthritis is caused by a combination of genetic and environmental factors. It is associated with intestinal inflammation, with a connection between Crohn's disease and ankylosing spondylitis. Reactive arthritis is primarily caused by gastrointestinal, genitourinary, respiratory infections, and genetic factors.

Spondyloarthritis is diagnosed based on symptoms and imaging. Early diagnosis criteria use genetic testing and more advanced forms of medical imaging. Spondyloarthritis is categorized into two groups based on the Assessment of SpondyloArthritis International Society (ASAS) criteria: primarily axial involvement and predominantly peripheral manifestations.

Non-steroidal anti-inflammatory drugs (NSAIDs) are administered first for active axial signs of spondyloarthritis. If NSAIDs are contraindicated or cause side effects, TNF blockers are used. Traditional disease-modifying antirheumatic drugs (DMARDs) are not used for people without peripheral disease signs.

== Signs and symptoms ==
In all subtypes of spondyloarthritis, inflammatory back pain and/or asymmetrical arthritis, mainly affecting the lower limbs, are the most common symptoms. Another characteristic is enthesitis, which is inflammation at the locations where ligaments, tendons, or joint capsules adhere to bone.

Sacroiliitis symptoms

Inflammatory back pain associated with ankylosing spondylitis usually starts slowly, has a dull feel to it, and spreads into the gluteal areas. Back pain has a nocturnal component, gets better with movement, and is worse in the morning. Axial arthritis may begin in the sacroiliac joints and work its way up to the cervical spine over time. Spinal abnormalities such as flattening of the lumbar lordosis, exaggeration of the thoracic kyphosis, and hyperextension of the cervical spine lead to limited spinal motion. Hip and shoulder arthritis can occur in some people with ankylosing spondylitis, usually early in the course of the illness. Usually, the other peripheral joints start to be affected later. Most frequently, there is an asymmetrical involvement of the lower extremities.

Reactive arthritis is an aseptic arthritis caused by an infectious pathogen found outside the joint. Particularly affecting the joints in the lower limbs, the arthritis is usually oligoarticular. In most cases, the condition develops quickly; two to four joints may swell and hurt in an uneven manner within a few days. Inflammatory back pain and dactylitis are also prevalent.

Psoriatic arthritis is known to present in five distinct patterns: oligoarticular (affecting four or fewer joints); polyarticular (affecting five or more joints); prominent distal interphalangeal (DIP) joint involvement; arthritis mutilans; and psoriatic spondylitis. More than 70% of cases follow the oligoarticular pattern. Distal joints are frequently impacted by psoriatic arthritis, which is typically asymmetrical.

Up to 20% of people with inflammatory bowel disease (IBD) develop spondyloarthropathy. Those with Crohn's disease are more likely to have this association than those with ulcerative colitis. Arthritis may appear before bowel disease. Usually, the lower extremities are asymmetrically affected by arthritis. The arthritis typically manifests abruptly and follows a migratory pattern.

In those who do not fit the criteria for any of the well-established spondyloarthropathies, the term "undifferentiated spondyloarthropathy" is used to characterize the signs of spondyloarthritis. A tiny percentage of these eventually experience a characterized spondyloarthritis, but most experience more general symptoms such as dactylitis, enthesitis, unilateral or alternating buttock pain, inflammatory back pain, and occasionally extra-articular symptoms.

== Causes ==
Spondyloarthritis is caused by a complicated combination of genetic polymorphisms and environment. The relative contributions of genes and environment may differ across different types of spondyloarthritis.

=== Risk factors ===
Microscopically visible ileal inflammation is seen in about 50% of people with spondyloarthritis and ankylosing spondylitis during ileocolonoscopy. There seems to be an immunological connection between the gut inflammation observed in Crohn's disease and ankylosing spondylitis. It is known that, in comparison to healthy controls, people with ankylosing spondylitis and those related to them have higher intestinal permeability.

=== Triggers ===
The majority of organisms responsible for reactive arthritis are gastrointestinal pathogens, such as Shigella flexneri, Clostridioides difficile, Yersinia enterocolitica and Yersinia pseudotuberculosis, Campylobacter jejuni and Campylobacter coli, and Salmonella spp. Genitourinary and respiratory infections, such as Chlamydia trachomatis and Chlamydia pneumoniae, have also been linked to reactive arthritis.

=== Genetics ===
Given the well-established familial aggregation and the concordance rate of up to 63% in identical twins (vs 23% in nonidentical twins), it is evident that genetic variables play a role in the susceptibility to ankylosing spondylitis. There is limited research on familial aggregation in other forms of spondyloarthritis.

HLA-B27 is a polymorphic form of the HLA-B molecule found in up to 95% of people with ankylosing spondylitis of European ancestry, 70% with reactive arthritis, 60% with psoriatic spondylitis, 25% with peripheral psoriatic arthritis, and 70% with spondylitis associated with inflammatory bowel disease.

== Mechanism ==
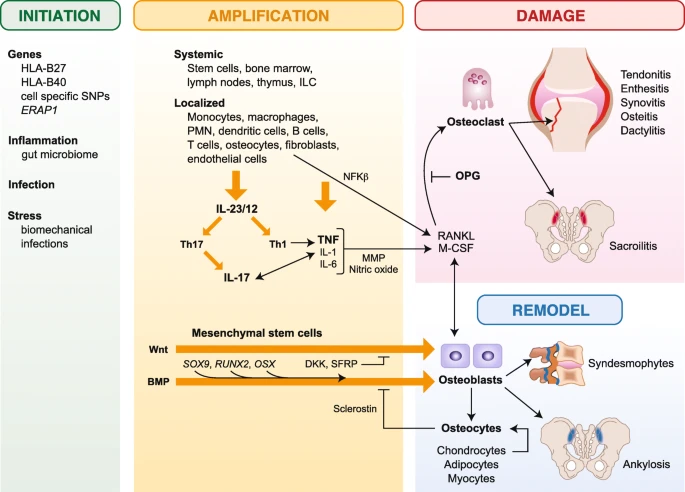
Inflammatory pathways in spondyloarthritis

The arthritogenic-peptide theory is the classic pathophysiological paradigm for spondyloarthritis. It argues that HLA-B27 displays self-peptides that resemble pathogen-derived peptides to CD8-restricted T cells. Two other theories have been proposed to explain HLA-B27's function. They suggest that HLA-B27's genesis may be autoinflammatory rather than autoimmune, as it plays a part in initiating innate immune responses instead of its traditional function of presenting antigens.

According to the first hypothesis, HLA-B27 heavy chains devoid of β2 microglobulin can form disulfide-linked homodimers that are produced at the cell surface and can be recognized directly by KIR3DL2 killer immunoglobulin-like receptors, regardless of the associated peptide.

According to the second hypothesis, the B pocket's Cys 67 residue causes HLA-B27 heavy-chain misfolding in the endoplasmic reticulum before assembling into complexes with peptide and β2 microglobulin. As a result, the unfolded protein response (UPR) modifies the immune cells' cytokine output and reactivity to various innate immunological stimuli.

== Diagnosis ==
Spondyloarthritis is primarily diagnosed, or at least first suspected, based on clinical factors. According to the current criteria for ankylosing spondylitis, a person must exhibit clinical symptoms of inflammatory back pain and limited spinal mobility together with radiological sacroiliitis. But many people with inflammatory back pain may have no radiographic evidence of sacroiliitis since up to 10 years might pass between the onset of inflammatory back pain and the development of radiographic sacroiliitis. Criteria for the early diagnosis of axial spondyloarthritis have been developed in light of the emergence of effective treatments. These criteria consider the added value of HLA-B27 testing, as well as current advancements in MRI scanning.

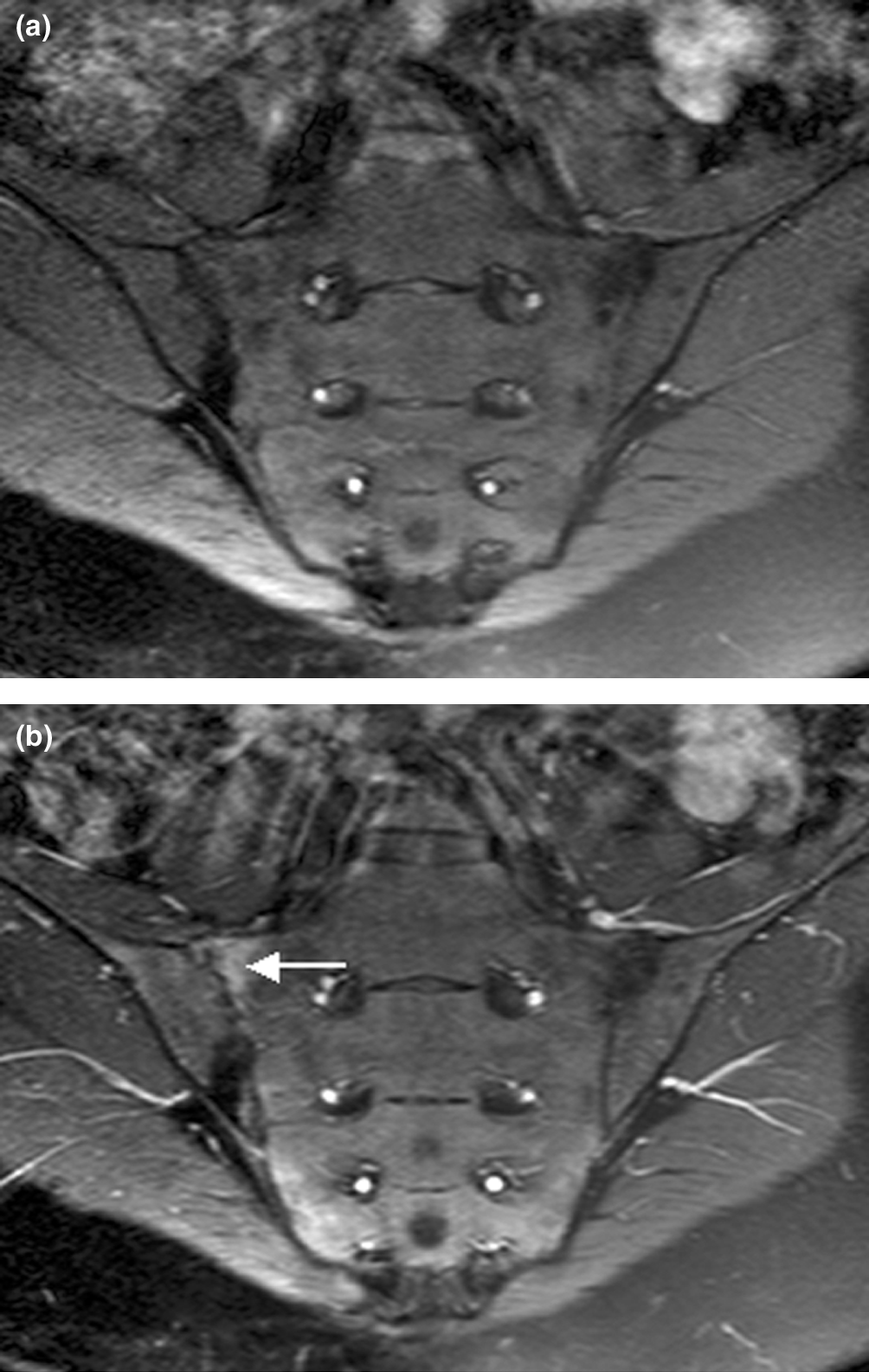
Magnetic resonance images of sacroiliac joints: psoriatic arthritis. Shown are T1-weighted semi-coronal magnetic resonance images through the sacroiliac joints (a) before and (b) after intravenous contrast injection. Enhancement is seen at the right sacroiliac joint (arrow), indicating active sacroiliitis.

Imaging is crucial to the spondyloarthritis diagnosis process. The most distinctive radiographic observation is the sacroiliac (SI) joints' erosion, ankylosis, and sclerosis. There must be clear evidence of sacroiliitis (at least grade 2 bilaterally or grade 3 unilaterally) on the radiographs to diagnose ankylosing spondylitis. When axial spondyloarthritis is suspected, sacroiliac joint radiographs are still the initial imaging approach. If radiographs clearly show sacroiliitis, then no more diagnostic imaging is required. But because structural change seen on radiographs can take months or years to emerge, normal radiographs or worrisome abnormalities only warrant additional diagnostic imaging in the context of suggestive clinical symptoms or findings. Furthermore, reading sacroiliac joint radiographs can be difficult and dependent on several variables, such as the image quality, the radiological technique, the reader's background, and variations in sacroiliac anatomy.

A challenge associated with radiographic imaging is the typical ten-year lag between the beginning of inflammatory back pain and the development of radiographic sacroiliitis. MRI imaging of the spine and entheses has made it possible to distinguish between inflammatory spinal lesions associated with ankylosing spondylitis and those unrelated to it earlier than is feasible with traditional radiography. It has also allowed for accurate anatomical description of spinal components. The only imaging modality that can precisely identify and evaluate spinal inflammation at this time is magnetic resonance imaging (MRI) of the sacroiliac joints and spine. It is also being developed as a gauge of disease activity and response to treatment.

When evaluating someone with reactive arthritis or psoriatic arthritis, plain radiographs of the hands and feet are very beneficial. Seventy-five percent of those with psoriatic arthritis have radiographic abnormalities of the peripheral joints, such as soft tissue swelling, erosions, periarticular osteopenia, periostitis, and narrowing of the joint space. Aggressive psoriatic arthritis erosions can result in the articular surface of the proximal bone of the joint being destroyed and taking on the look of a "pencil in cup."

Laboratory abnormalities in spondyloarthritis are nonspecific and less effective for diagnosing a specific disease than clinical presentation. Normochromic normocytic anemia, increased C reactive protein, and erythrocyte sedimentation rate are frequently present nonspecific indicators.

Testing for the human leukocyte antigen (HLA) can be the most beneficial laboratory investigation. Since only 5% of those with HLA-B27 in the general population will develop ankylosing spondylitis, the correlation between HLA-B27 and the prevalence of spondyloarthritis is weak. Therefore, the illness prevalence in a particular population must be taken into account when interpreting results from HLA-B27 testing.

=== Classification ===
Spondyloarthritis is classified into two categories based on the Assessment of SpondyloArthritis International Society (ASAS) classification criteria: primarily axial involvement and predominantly peripheral manifestations.

==== Axial spondyloarthritis ====
A person must meet two requirements to be considered for a diagnosis of axial spondyloarthritis: they must be under 45 years old and have experienced back pain of any kind for at least three months.

The second step comprises two sections that are assessed independently according to the existence of either sacroiliitis on imaging or human leukocyte antigen (HLA) B27:

- HLA-B27-positive people — To diagnose axial spondyloarthritis in those who test positive for HLA-B27, at least two more spondyloarthritis symptoms from the list below must be present.
- Sacroiliitis on imaging — When sacroiliitis is diagnosed in those with structural alterations on plain radiographs or subchondral bone marrow edema (BME) on MRI, at least one additional sign of spondyloarthritis from the list below should be present.

Spondyloarthritis features:

- Inflammatory back pain — Several definitions have been put forth for inflammatory back pain. Inflammatory back pain is characterized by the presence of four or more of the following five factors:
  - Onset at <40 years old.
  - Insidious onset.
  - Improved with exercise.
  - Not improved by rest.
  - Pain at night.
- Arthritis.
- Heel enthesitis.
- Uveitis.
- Dactylitis.
- Psoriasis.
- Inflammatory bowel disease.
- Good response to nonsteroidal anti-inflammatory drugs (NSAIDs).
- Family history of spondyloarthritis.
- Elevated C-reactive protein (CRP).

==== Peripheral spondyloarthritis ====
The initial requirement is that a person have at least one of the following three findings:

- Arthritis.
- Enthesitis.
- Dactylitis.

If the person meets the previous requirements, they must exhibit at least one of Group A's spondyloarthritis features or two of Group B's spondyloarthritis features.

Group A spondyloarthritis features:

- Uveitis.
- Psoriasis.
- Inflammatory bowel disease.
- Preceding infection.
- HLA-B27.
- Sacroiliitis on imaging.

Group B spondyloarthritis features:

- Arthritis.
- Enthesitis.
- Dactylitis.
- Inflammatory back pain in the past.
- Family history of spondyloarthritis.

== Treatment ==
Improving the persons's state (pain, functional impairment, etc.) and preventing further clinical deterioration are the goals of spondyloarthritis treatment. The ASAS has issued guidelines regarding the use of TNF blockers specifically as well as the general care of spondyloarthritis. Non-steroidal anti-inflammatory drugs (NSAIDs) should be administered first to those with active, primarily axial signs of spondyloarthritis. If NSAID medication is contraindicated, does not work, or causes side effects, people are then treated with tumor necrosis factor (TNF) blockers. Because there is insufficient evidence of treatment efficacy, those with axial spondyloarthritis who do not exhibit peripheral disease signs do not receive traditional disease-modifying antirheumatic drugs (DMARDs). But if peripheral arthritis is present, those with spondyloarthritis should get treatment with conventional DMARDs before TNF-blocker medication and after the failure of NSAID therapy.

According to a recent Cochrane systematic review of published work, supervised group physiotherapy is superior to home exercises, individual home-based or supervised exercise programs are preferable to no intervention, and in-patient spondyloarthritis exercise therapy combined with follow-up group physiotherapy is superior to group physiotherapy alone. Recreational exercise, whether performed in a group setting or alone, helps people with ankylosing spondylitis feel less stiff and in pain. Back exercise also helps these people function better, but the effects vary depending on how long the disease has been present. People's health improves when they engage in back exercises five days a week and recreational activity for at least half an hour each day.

NSAIDs continue to be the first line of treatment for spondylitis, and many people will get adequate symptom relief on their own with just these medications. The best NSAID for treating those with ankylosing spondylitis appears to be tolmetin or indomethacin, although there is insufficient evidence to support this theory in rheumatologic practice. The majority of those with established peptic ulcer disease should take selective COX-2 antagonists.

When peripheral arthritis coexists with axial illness, conventional DMARDs such methotrexate, sulfasalazine, or leflunomide may be useful in treating peripheral spondyloarthritis. These drugs are typically ineffective in treating axial symptoms of spondyloarthritis.

After 2000, a number of studies examining the effects of TNF blockers on people with ankylosing spondylitis were published. These studies demonstrated that TNF-blocker therapy improves clinical symptoms, CRP levels, and MRI-detectable inflammation in the spine or sacroiliac joints. These improvements were noted with certolizumab pegol, etanercept, infliximab, adalimumab, and golimumab.

== Outlook ==
The lives of people with ankylosing spondylitis are profoundly affected. According to recent statistics, people with ankylosing spondylitis, particularly those who are older and have had the condition longer, may be more likely than population controls to be work handicapped or not engage in the labor market. Additionally, those with ankylosing spondylitis were more likely to have never married or been divorced. Compared to expectations, women with ankylosing spondylitis were less likely to have had children. People with ankylosing spondylitis experience up to 50% more sick leave episodes, an overall 8% loss of productivity, and a thrice higher rate of disability than the general population. Their overall frequency of disability and economic costs are comparable to those of rheumatoid arthritis. Furthermore, increasing evidence indicates that cardiovascular illness puts those with ankylosing spondylitis at risk for early death.

Early research on the course of reactive arthritis indicated a poor prognosis. But more recent research has shown that the prognosis for reactive arthritis is generally favourable. Within six months of onset, the majority of cases seem to resolve.

The prognosis for psoriatic arthritis is worse than previously thought, according to recent research. It has also been demonstrated that those with psoriatic arthritis have a higher mortality rate, which is linked to high erythrocyte sedimentation rate, high usage of medications, and early radiographic damage.

While not well researched, the prognosis for juvenile spondyloarthritisis is unknown. According to the data available, children who have had a condition for longer than five years are more likely to be impaired. After five years of the illness, the chance of remission was only 17 percent. After ten years of the condition, moderate to severe restriction affects around 60% of children with juvenile spondyloarthritis.

== Epidemiology ==
The prevalence of ankylosing spondylitis and spondyloarthritis, in particular, varies across populations and is similar to that of HLA-B27. The incidence of spondyloarthritis as a disease entity was recorded in only four investigations, and ranged from 0.48/100,000 in Japan to 62.5/100,000 in Spain. Data on the prevalence of spondyloarthritis were reported from 16 investigations; the results ranged from 0.01% in Japan to 2.5% in Alaska.

Those with European heritage have a 0.2% to 0.7% prevalence of ankylosing spondylitis. Reactive arthritis prevalence is unknown and likely varies with time based on endemic rates of the enteric (Shigella, Salmonella, Campylobacter) and sexually acquired (chlamydia) infections that cause it. In the general community, 1–3% of people have psoriasis. It is less known how common psoriatic arthritis is, and it is more common in people with more severe disease; population studies in Caucasians suggest that the prevalence is about 0.1%. Inflammatory bowel disease about 400 Caucasians per 100,000 people, with a male–to–female ratio of 1:1. People of Asian and African ancestry rarely experience it. Varying reports have varying risks for spondylitis and peripheral arthritis, which may be related to the observer's specialty. 15% to 20% of people with inflammatory bowel disease have spondylitis. Peripheral arthritis is generally less common in those with ulcerative colitis (up to 10%) than in those with Crohn's disease (up to 20%), but it is more common in cases where a rheumatologist served as the assessor.

== History ==
Moll and associates first proposed the idea of a collection of similar conditions known as seronegative spondyloarthritides in 1974. Psoriatic arthritis, reactive arthritis, arthritis associated with inflammatory bowel disease, a subtype of juvenile idiopathic arthritis, and ankylosing spondylitis comprise the group of disorders currently referred to as spondyloarthritis.

== Fossil record ==
Spondyloarthropathies appear in the fossil record. A notable example is thoracic vertebrae 15 and 16 of a Late Pleistocene gomphotheriid proboscidean from Chile.

== See also ==
- Spondylitis
- Spondylosis
