= Xeligekimab =

Monoclonal antibody

Monoclonal antibody
- Type: ?

Clinical data
- Trade names: Jinlixi
- Other names: GR1501
- ATC code: None

Legal status
- Legal status: CN: ℞-only

Identifiers
- CAS Number: 2382921-73-3
- UNII: MC5WXU879E

Xeligekimab (development code GR1501; brand name Jinlixi) is a monoclonal antibody that neutralizes interleukin-17A; it is being developed for plaque psoriasis, axial spondyloarthritis, and lupus nephritis. It was in Phase III trials in 2023 and was approved in 2024 in China for the treatment of adult patients with moderate to severe plaque psoriasis.
