= Spondylopathy =

Disorders of the vertibrae

- Specialty: Rheumatology

Spondylopathies are disorders of the vertebrae, when involving inflammation, it can be called spondylitis. In contrast, a spondyloarthropathy is a condition involving the vertebral joints, but many conditions involve both spondylopathy and spondyloarthropathy.

Examples of this include ankylosing spondylitis and spondylosis.

== See also ==
- Dorsopathies
- Spondyloarthropathy
- Spondylolisthesis
- Spondylosis
- Spondylitis
- Spondylolysis
