= Balanitis circinata =

- Other names: Circinate balanitis
- Balanitis circinata
- Specialty: Dermatology

Balanitis circinata (also known as circinate balanitis) is a skin condition comprising a serpiginous ring-shaped dermatitis of the glans penis. While circinate balanitis is one of the most common cutaneous manifestations of reactive arthritis, it can also occur independently. Topical corticosteroid therapy is the most commonly used treatment, and topical calcineurin inhibitors have also been used successfully.

== Signs and symptoms ==
At the first stages of the condition, patients show pinhead-sized lesions covered by white plaque, which grow into a flat, red region with a white margin. Despite the visible symptoms, patients rarely experience burning or itching, and the lesions rarely smell strange. Due to its visual appearance, balanitis circinata is often misdiagnosed as a fungal infection, especially in those that have no other symptoms of reactive arthritis.

== Cause ==
Reactive arthritis is characterized by nongonococcal urethritis, conjunctivitis, and arthritis. Reactive arthritis belongs to the group of arthritides known as the spondyloarthritides. There are two main types of reactive arthritis: post-venereal and post-enteric. Chlamydia trachomatis is thought to be the most common cause of reactive arthritis, in general. Until recently, even the terminology for the condition itself was unclear as multiple eponyms and names have been associated with reactive arthritis. In recent years, a great deal has been learnt about the epidemiology, pathophysiology and treatment of reactive arthritis and chlamydia-induced reactive arthritis, specifically. Prospective epidemiologic data suggest that chlamydia-induced reactive arthritis is underdiagnosed. Other truths being actively revealed include data suggesting that the pathogen itself (i.e., chlamydia) might play an equally important role, or perhaps even more important, than the host with disease susceptibility; asymptomatic chlamydial infections might be a common cause of reactive arthritis and the two variants of reactive arthritis might respond differently to treatment in spite of the congruent clinical presentation. However, much about this syndrome remains shrouded in mystery. Recent data has been suggesting that Chlamydia-induced reactive arthritis might be a common condition that clinicians are simply failing to recognise. Therefore, an emphasis is placed on disease awareness since viable treatment options are emerging.

== Treatment ==
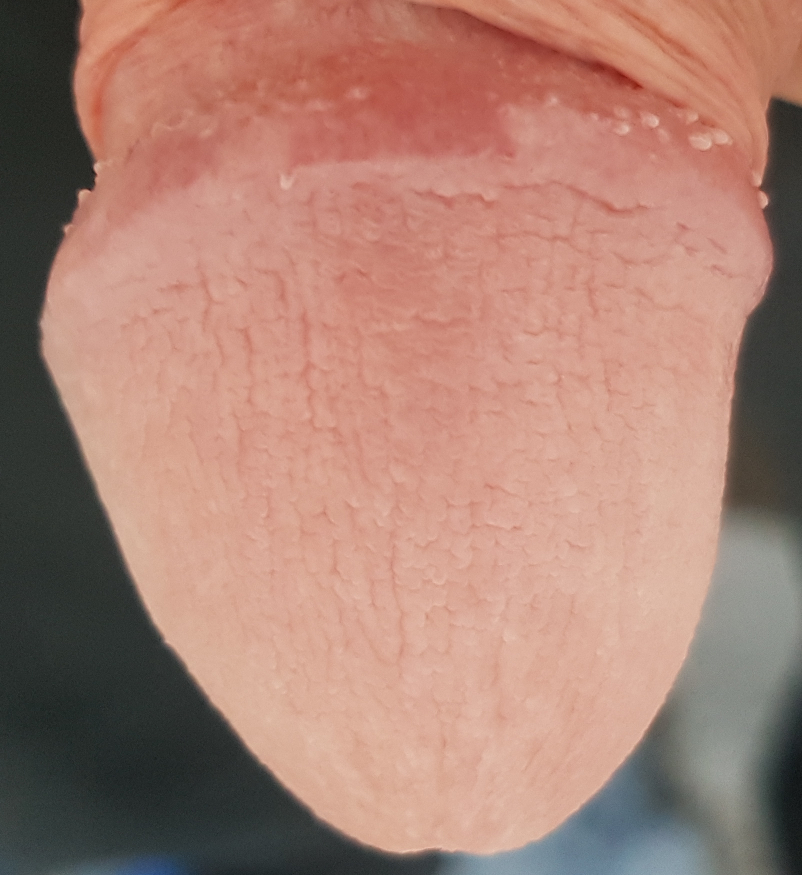
The same person as above shows no signs of balanitis circinata during a treatment with pimecrolimus.

Balanitis circinata is one out of multiple manifestations of the reactive arthritis.

Right now, topical corticosteroid therapy is the most commonly used treatment, and topical calcineurin inhibitors have also been used successfully. Newer tests on patients showed that a less harmful off-label topical treatment with the immunomodulator pimecrolimus or the immunosuppressant tacrolimus can prevent all visible symptoms of this disease. Since reactive arthritis cannot be healed as such, affected people are forced to a continuous topical treatment – otherwise they will again note first symptoms after three to four days without it.

However, strong debates and controversies continue regarding the exact indications of immunomodulators like pimecrolimus and their duration of use in the absence of active controlled trials. A study released in 2015 (tested were 7,457 children with a total of 26,792 person-years) did not find any evidence that pimecrolimus could cause cancer.
