= Keratoderma blennorrhagicum =

Skin lesions associated with reactive arthritis

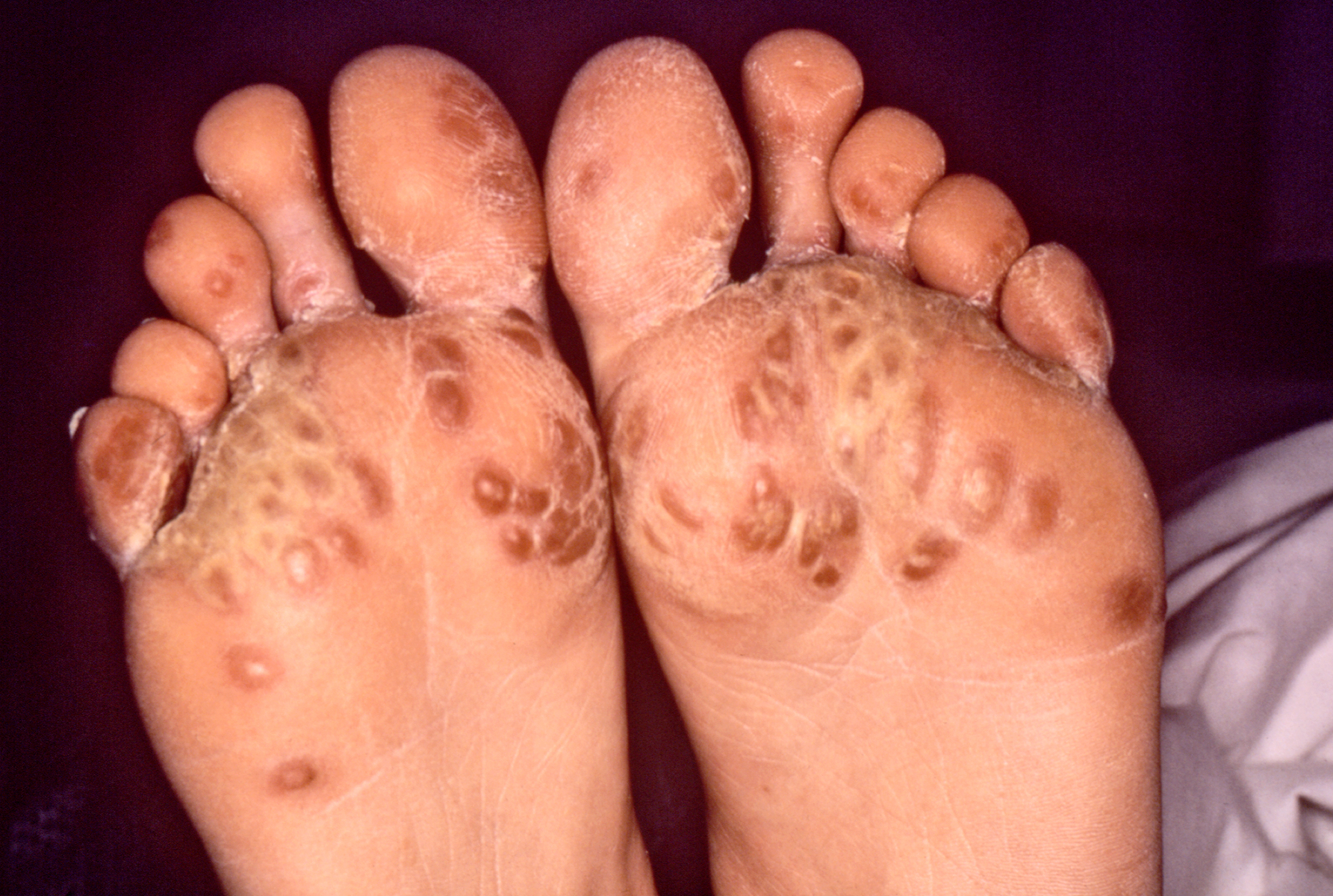
- The rash on the bottom of this individual’s feet, known as keratoderma blennorrhagicum, was due to reactive arthritis
- Specialty: Dermatology

Keratoderma blennorrhagicum (from kerato- 'keratinized' derma- 'skin' blenno- 'mucous' and -rrhagia 'discharge'; also called keratoderma blennorrhagica or keratosis blennorrhagica) are skin lesions commonly found on the palms and soles but which may spread to the scrotum, scalp and trunk. The lesions may resemble psoriasis.

Keratoderma blennorrhagicum is commonly seen as an additional feature of reactive arthritis in almost 15% of male patients. The appearance is usually of a vesico-pustular waxy lesion with a yellow brown colour. These lesions may join to form larger crusty plaques with desquamating edges.

== See also ==
- Keratoderma
- Keratosis
