= Trabecular oedema =

Trabecular edema
- Other names: Bone marrow edema (BME, first used in 1988), bone marrow lesion (BML)
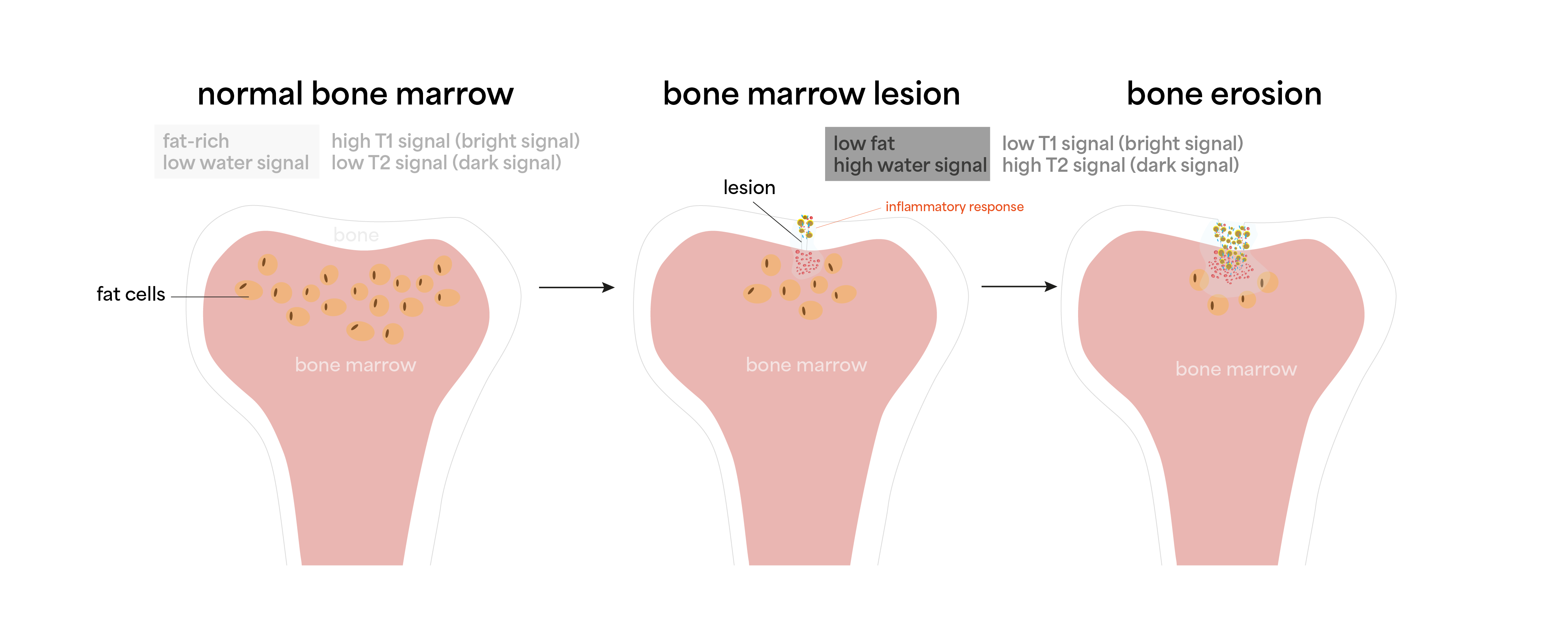
- A schematic diagram showing the mechanism of bone marrow edema, adapted from.
- Symptoms: Joint pain, effusion, warmth.
- Types: Primary bone marrow edema, secondary bone marrow edema.
- Causes: (For secondary BME) Trauma, degenerative lesions, inflammatory lesions, ischaemic lesions, infectious lesions, metabolic/endocrine lesions, iatrogenic lesions.
- Risk factors: Sex, age, occupation, history of physical trauma, obesity, previous bone marrow damage, immunosuppressive/hormonal treatments, relevant medical conditions.
- Diagnostic method: Magnetic resonance imaging (MRI).
- Differential diagnosis: Ultrasound scans, computed tomography (CT) scans.
- Treatment: Core decompression, pharmaceutical treatment, extracorporeal shock wave therapy (ESWT).
- Medication: Non-steroidal anti-inflammatory drugs (e.g. Iloprost).

Trabecular edema, also known as bone marrow edema (BME), is a traditional term describing the interstitial fluid accumulation at the trabecular bone marrow. The term was first used in 1988, referring to the changes in the bone marrow due to inflammation. Bone marrow edema was later renamed to bone marrow lesion (BML), as later studies show that the increased fluid content in the trabecular bone was more likely caused by inflammatory responses (e.g. increased vascularization, lymphocyte infiltration) instead of fluid influx (i.e. edema). Hence, this narrows down the condition to the damage at the articular surface of the trabecular bones. Despite so, the terms BME and BML are still used interchangeably in radiology.

This condition normally affects the musculoskeletal system, and commonly manifests in lower extremities, including but not limited to the feet, ankle joints, knee joints, and hip joints. Common signs and symptoms include pain, joint swelling, and limited joint functionality. BME can be further separated into two types, based on their causes: primary BME and secondary BME. Primary BME, also called spontaneous BME or bone marrow edema syndrome (BMES), means bone marrow edema without obvious causes. Secondary BME meanwhile refers to bone marrow edema caused by another condition. It is usually diagnosed with magnetic resonance imaging (MRI), supplemented with ultrasound scans. However, BME cannot be detected by X-ray or computerized tomography (CT) scans directly, but they are helpful in differential diagnosis. Minor cases are usually treated through proper resting and taking non-steroidal anti-inflammatory drugs (NSAIDs), while steroid therapy or even surgery may be needed for more serious ones.

Pre-existing conditions like arthritis or bone cancer induce stress onto the bones, leading to a greater risk of BME within patients suffering from those conditions. Other studies also list high bone density as a risk factor to some local bone marrow lesions. sex, age, earlier immunosuppressive treatments, or pre-existing physical trauma are all risk factors of bone marrow edema. Prevention of bone marrow edema is difficult due to the vast variety of causes, but detecting bone marrow edema can predict subsequent progression to bone erosion or the need to replace the joint.

== Signs and symptoms ==
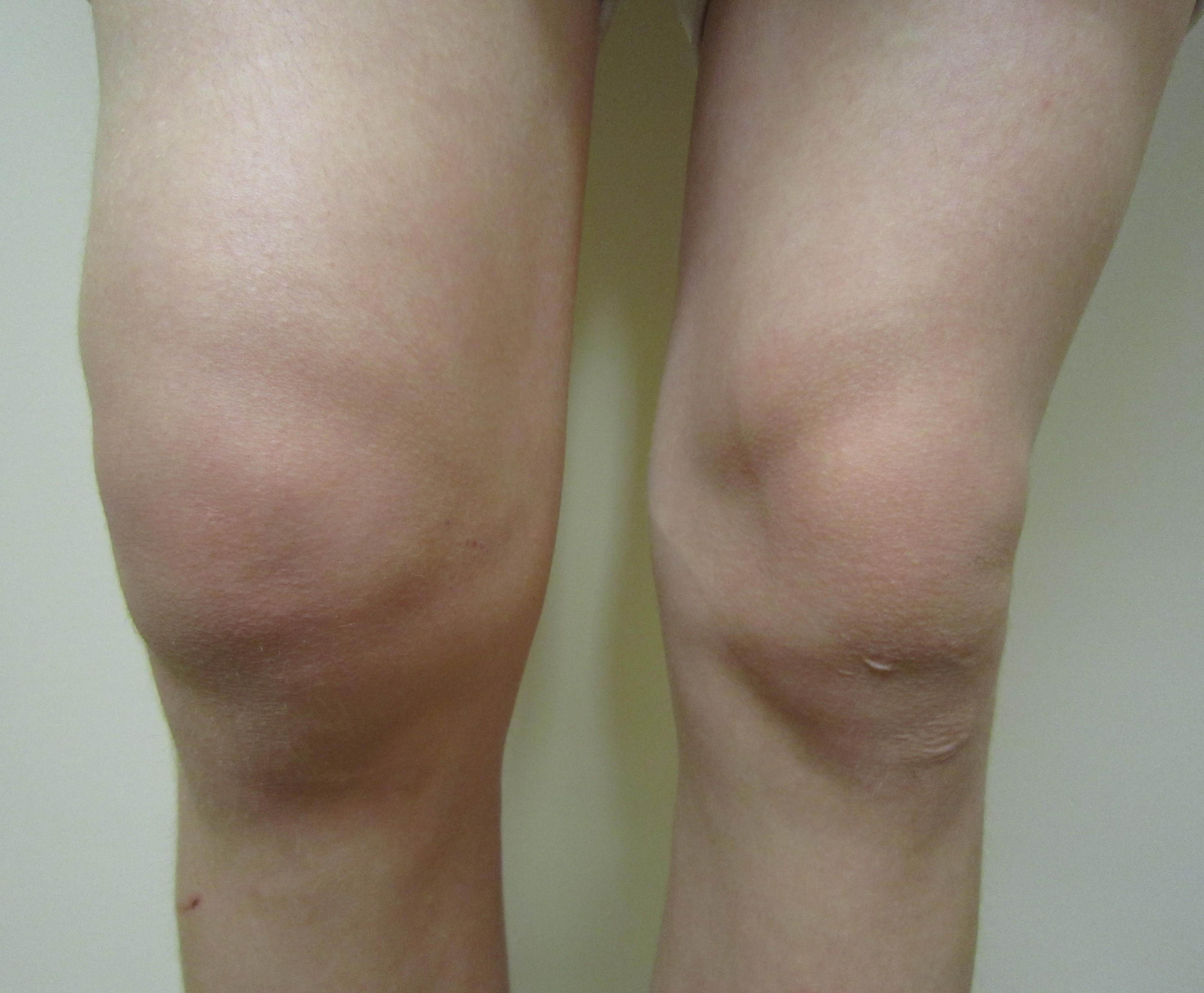
A common characteristic of patients with bone marrow edema is joint effusion (swelling of joints) in lower extremities.

Common symptoms of BME include joint effusion, joint pain, and warmth, which are related to joint inflammation. Patients usually have severe pain in the bones or joints, which often leads to limitations in functionality that harm their quality of life.

=== Primary bone marrow edema ===
In primary bone marrow edema patients, initial painful symptoms usually appear in the first month, followed by a peak in pain level two months after onset. The transient increase in interstitial fluid leads to increased intraosseous pressure and aggravated neurovascular bundles. The symptoms typically fade a few months after the phase with maximum pain level, which may be due to the bone remodelling abilities as new bone formation and vascular reconstruction steps are observed.

Another common characteristic among BME patients is joint pain, experienced around the affected region.

=== Secondary bone marrow edema ===
In secondary bone marrow edema patients, repeated traumatic stress may disrupt the trabecular marrow structure, hence there is interstitial fluid leakage or haemorrhage inside the marrow spaces. Also, heightened blood flow or a congested vascular drainage at the bone marrow may cause BME. The increased fluid content leads to an increase in intraosseous pressure as well as decreased perfusion, which disturbs the neurovascular bundles and result in pain and swelling. Local cytokine production mediates the inflammatory response and thus worsens the symptoms.

== Pathophysiology ==
Bone marrow edema does not have similar histological characteristics as other types of edema, such as pulmonary edema. This is because it is commonly caused by inflammation and vascularization, resulting in displacement of bone marrow, originally rich in adipocytes, by hydrophilic material. Said material may be immune cells, particularly T and B lymphocytes, and microvessels.

However, the exact mechanism that causes bone marrow edema is still unknown. It is only known that the presence of bone marrow edema is usually associated with the progression of various diseases such as osteonecrosis. Different pathophysiology mechanisms are established based on the cause of the bone marrow edema. For example, if the cause of bone marrow edema is rheumatoid arthritis, the edema is attributed to the penetration sites caused by the resorption of mineralized cortical bone beneath articular cartilage. These penetration sites allow the entry of inflammatory infiltrates, which could possibly be lymphocytic aggregates or invaded synovial tissue that are heavily vascularized, contributing to high water content in the bone marrow compartment. As in some other causes such as renal transplantation, impairment of microcirculation could result in an increase of the intraosseous pressure. The increased hydrostatic pressure causes more fluid leakage out of the capillaries, and bone marrow edema is the direct result.

A common characteristic among bone marrow edema patients is the pain experienced, due to the aggravation of the neurovascular bundle by increased intraosseous pressure.

== Etiology ==
A crucial element for a physician to diagnose BME is the ability to differentiate whether the patient suffers from primary or secondary bone marrow edema, as primary bone marrow edema could indicate stage of progression to osteonecrosis. Unfortunately, interdisciplinary guidelines and management algorithms regarding BME are currently underdeveloped, resulting in repetitive checking, delayed diagnosis or treatment.

=== Primary bone marrow edema ===
Primary bone marrow edema is also referred to as spontaneous bone marrow edema, or bone marrow edema syndrome (BMES). This category of BME does not have a particular cause but is self-limiting in nature, meaning that symptoms usually resolve by themselves within three to nine months after onset without pathological consequences.

There are theories proposing possible etiologies like vascular anomalies or thromboembolism, but they are yet to be proven.

=== Secondary bone marrow edema ===
Secondary bone marrow edema is caused by pre-existing conditions, which may be interdisciplinary. Hence, this category of BME is commonly found in MRIs, in which the original intention was not to diagnose this particular condition. The different causes of secondary bone marrow edema are listed as follows:

==== Trauma ====
Trauma events cause frequent microfractures. For instance, in transient regional osteoporosis and bone bruises, bone marrow lesions start in one skeletal region and spontaneously appear in another skeletal region with time. The cause is associated with active osteoporotic changes and low bone mineral density, which allows microfractures to occur in the affected region.

Osteoarthritis, an example of a degenerative lesion, is a common cause of bone marrow edema due to its inflammatory characteristics.

==== Degenerative lesions ====
Tendinitis has a strong association with bone marrow edema. A study reported around one-third of tendinitis patients have bone marrow edema, and even all cases are revealed to be an uptake in isotope scans.

Osteoarthritis is another disease that has a strong association with bone marrow edema due to mechanical loading, as well as stress on the subchondral region.

==== Inflammatory lesions ====
There exist three types of inflammatory lesions: seropositive inflammatory arthropathy, seronegative arthritis, and enthesitis. Bone marrow lesions tend to be present in inflammatory arthropathy due to increased vascularisation, and are often present in sites of arthritis and enthesitis as well.

==== Ischaemic lesions ====
Avascular necrosis of bone is directly related to bone marrow lesions; the severity of bone marrow lesions is correlated with the intensity of avascular osteonecrosis.

==== Infectious lesions ====
Bacterial infections and bone marrow lesion development are closely related, as infection directly leads to inflammation. For example, infections of the foot in diabetic patients that spread to the bone are associated with bone marrow lesions.

==== Metabolic/Endocrine lesions ====
Hormonal imbalances such as severe hyperthyroidism and hyperparathyroidism, which lead to impairment of bone metabolism, could cause bone marrow edema. Changes in connective tissue deposition such as uric acid composition in gout could cause bone marrow edema.

==== Iatrogenic lesions ====
Damage could be done to bone marrow during surgery or radiotherapy, leading to inflammation and hence bone marrow edema as in other lesions. Patients who have undergone hormone therapy are also susceptible to bone marrow edema due to insufficient bone metabolism and high bone turnover.

Osteonecrosis risk may also be increased by common immunosuppressants like cyclosporine and tacrolimus, due to the induced vasoconstriction. Drugs such as sirolimus may potentiate this effect by similar action or influencing the lipid profile.

== Risk factors ==
Bone marrow edema is usually caused by or associated with pre-existing conditions. Numerous epidemiological studies in patients with bone marrow edema have found certain patterns of characteristics among the participants; for example, certain medical conditions such as osteoporosis are substantial risk factors for developing bone marrow edema. Several common risk factors are listed as follows:

- Sex; women in particular have a higher rate of contracting bone marrow edema
- Age; being at least 50 years old is also a major risk factor
- Occupation/Poor posture
- History of physical trauma
- Overweightness/Obesity
- Previous damage to bone marrow due to surgery or radiation therapy
- Immunosuppressive or hormonal treatments
- Relevant medical conditions
  - Arthritis
  - Bone cancer
  - Bone infection
  - Osteoporosis
  - Post-renal transplantation syndrome

== Diagnosis ==
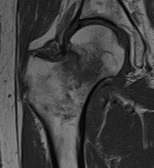
T1-weighted, turbo spin echo MRI of a 79-year-old woman's hip bones. The low signal areas of the image are due to bone marrow edema.

=== Magnetic resonance imaging (MRI) ===
Diagnosis of trabecular edema is primarily done via magnetic resonance imaging (MRI). The presence of edema within the bone marrow yields a visible signal on the MRI, due to displacement of the normally fatty tissue within the marrow by interstitial fluid with higher water content; this change in composition is then reflected by the MRI due to differences in the T1-weighted and T2-weighted images.

A healthy bone is rich in fat and has lower water content, therefore it appears as bright signals on T1-weighted images and dark on T2-weighted images. Conversely, regions with trabecular edema has lower fat and higher water content. Hence, they have a comparatively lower intensity than normal bone tissues on a T1-weighted image, and a higher intensity on a T2-weighted image.

=== Ultrasound Scan ===
Being less sensitive compared to MRI scans, ultrasound scans are able to detect some abnormalities like joint effusion and capsular thickening, which are common in BME patients.

=== Computed Tomography (CT) Scan ===
Computed tomography (CT) scans cannot directly diagnose bone marrow edema, but it is sometimes used to supplement MRI scans for differential diagnosis. It is due to its ability to show any lesions or fractures in trabecular, subchondral or chondral structures, which aids physicians to understand if there are any underlying bone pathologies leading to the observed symptoms.

== Treatment ==
=== Core decompression ===
As edema is by definition accumulation of excess fluid within body tissue, one method of treating edema is draining said excess fluid. Core decompression, otherwise often used to treat avascular necrosis, is a surgical procedure that involves drilling a hole into dead bone tissue, leading to the reduction of pressure within the bone and increase of blood flow; thus, the excess fluid can be drained and the edema treated. A combination of core decompression with injection of hydroxyapatite cement into the tissue affected with bone marrow edema has been reported to significantly reduce pain levels.

=== Pharmaceutical treatment ===
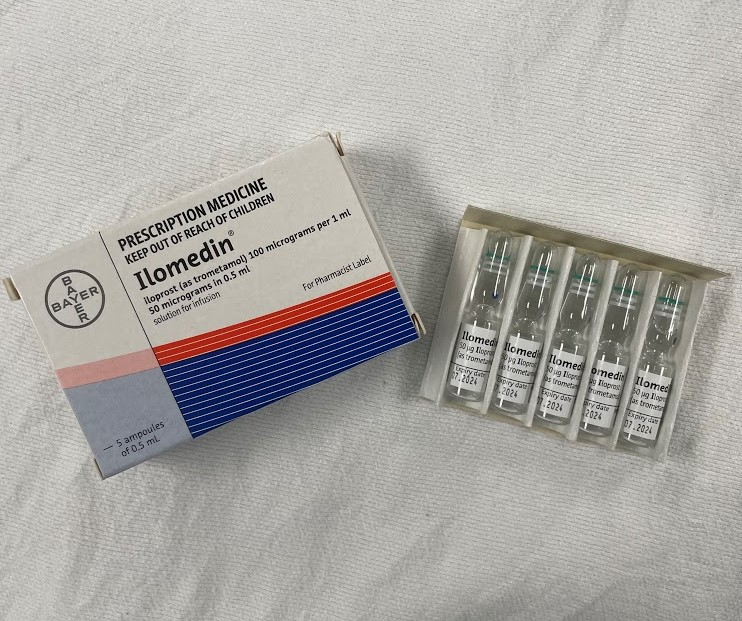
Iloprost, a non-steroidal anti-inflammatory drug commonly given to bone marrow edema patients to relieve their symptoms.

Another goal of treating trabecular edema is to manage the symptoms, such as pain. Nonsteroidal anti-inflammatory drugs such as Iloprost, a medication that dilates arterial vascular beds, have been proven to aid in treating bone marrow lesions when administered in an intravenous manner, resulting in reduction of pain and restoration of functionality in affected areas.

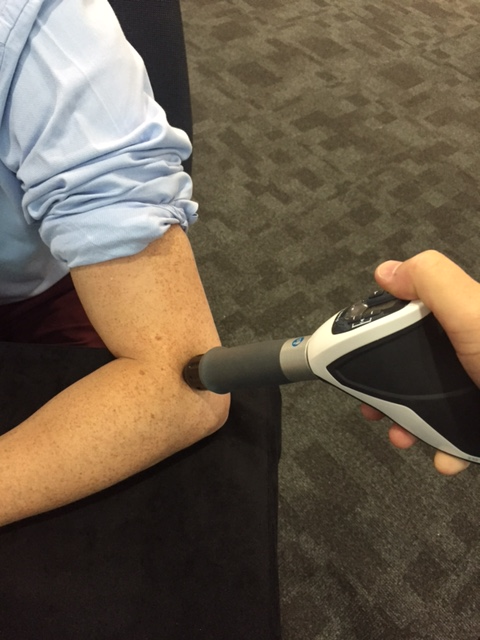
Extracorporeal shock wave therapy (ESWT) being administered to the arm.

=== Physical treatment ===
Yet another method of treating bone marrow edema is extracorporeal shock wave therapy (ESWT), a process involving re-injury of cells via acoustic shock waves to promote regeneration of blood vessels and bone. The treatment has been proven to halve the size of areas affected by edema after six months of administration.

== Research ==
Recent evidence found associations between vitamin status and bone marrow edema syndrome. A pathophysiological association is found between vitamin D status, which denotes osteopenia, and bone marrow edema syndrome. The association has yet to be found to be causative. As for vitamin C, vitamin deficiency in scurvy patients is a causative factor but no current literature reports acute and subacute vitamin C deficiency. For future research, more advanced study designs such as randomized clinical trials are needed to evaluate therapy by means of vitamin supplements.

On the other hand, another recent literature review was performed on studies published from 2011 to 2021, investigating the efficacy of various conservative treatments of BMES. Although comparison of the studies in a highly reliable manner was difficult due to lack of standardisation of treatment methods, studies still found prospective results in treating bone marrow edema efficiently. Future studies should establish a standardised radiological score system to evaluate the areas of bone marrow edema.
