= Sacroiliitis =

Inflammation of the sacroiliac joint of the pelvis

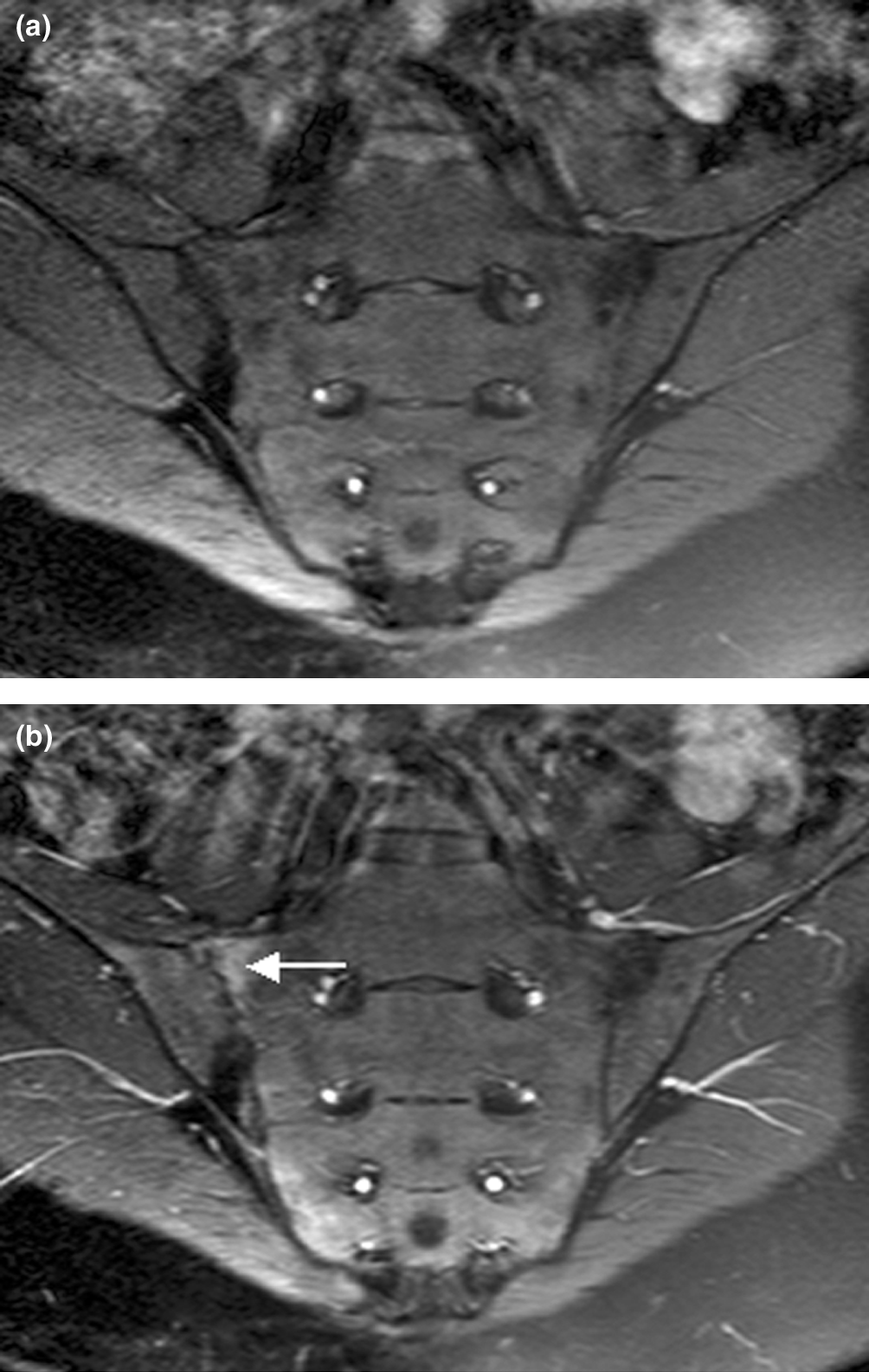
- Magnetic resonance images of sacroiliac joints. Shown are T1-weighted semi-coronal magnetic resonance images through the sacroiliac joints (a) before and (b) after intravenous contrast injection. Enhancement is seen at the right sacroiliac joint (arrow, left side of image), indicating active sacroiliitis. This patient had psoriatic arthritis.
- Specialty: Rheumatology
- Diagnostic method: X-ray, MRI

Sacroiliitis is a condition caused by inflammation within the sacroiliac (SI) joint, where the base of the spine (called the sacrum), and the pelvis (called the ilium), connect. The term "sacroiliitis" combines the words sacrum, ilium, and the Latin term "itis", which denotes inflammation.

Inflammation in the SI joint can develop through several different processes. It is a feature of spondyloarthropathies, such as axial spondyloarthritis (including ankylosing spondylitis), psoriatic arthritis, reactive arthritis or arthritis related to inflammatory bowel diseases, including ulcerative colitis or Crohn's disease. It is also the most common presentation of arthritis from brucellosis. Problems with the SI joint are in some cases caused by injury in childbirth, other injury, a congenital condition, or a viral or bacterial infection.

== Symptoms and signs ==
People suffering from sacroiliitis can often experience symptoms in a number of different ways, however it is commonly related to the amount of pressure that is put onto the SI joint. Symptoms commonly include prolonged, inflammatory pain in the lower back region, hips or buttocks. The pain is typically axial (as opposed to radicular), meaning that the location of the condition is also where the pain is occurring. However, in more severe cases, the pain can become more radicular and manifest itself in seemingly unrelated areas of the body including the legs, groin and feet.

Symptoms are typically aggravated by:

- Transitioning from sitting to standing
- Walking or standing for extended periods of time
- Running
- Climbing stairs
- Taking long strides
- Rolling over in bed
- Bearing more weight on one leg

== Cause ==
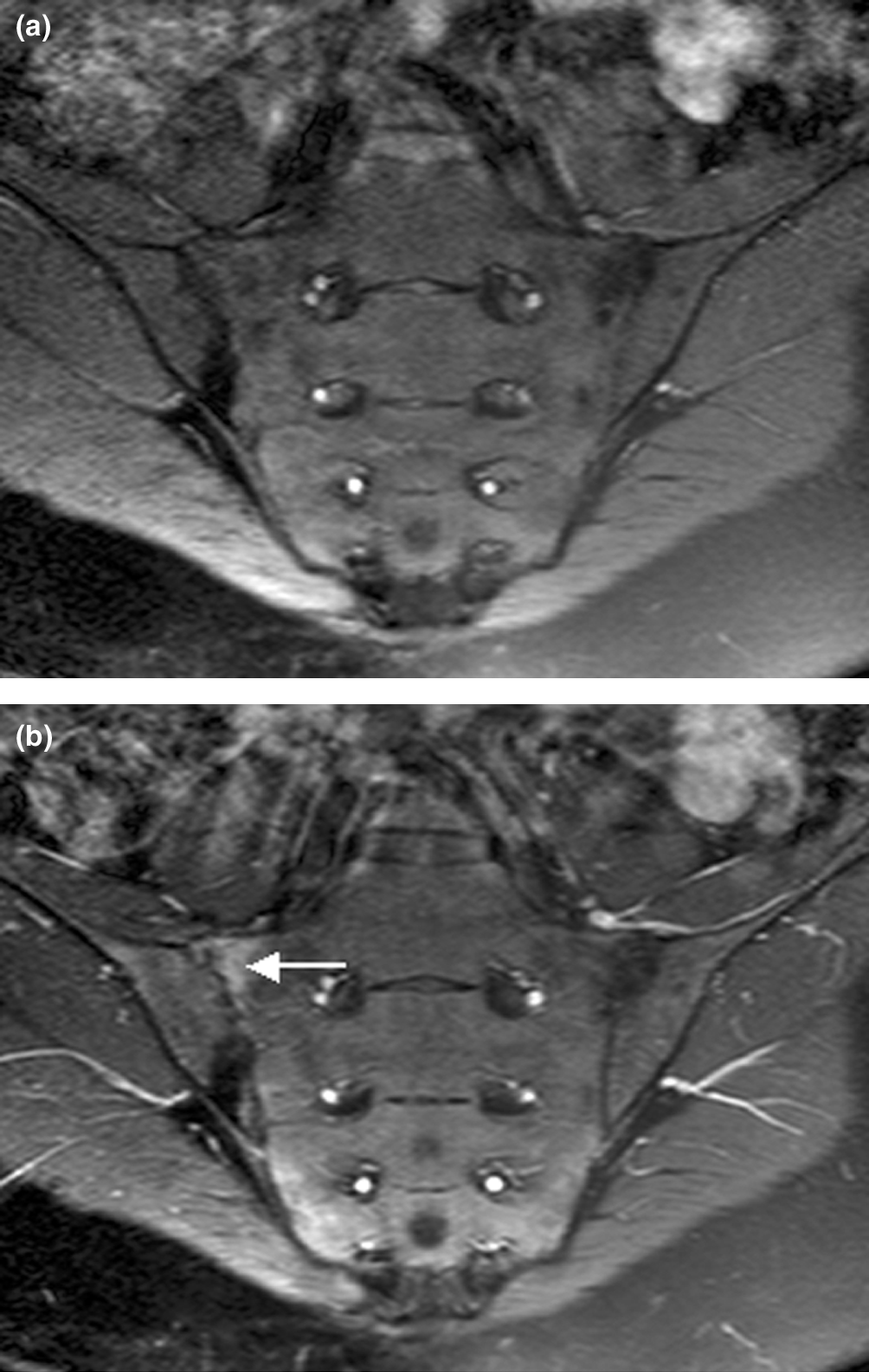
Magnetic resonance images of sacroiliac joints. Shown are T1-weighted semi-coronal magnetic resonance images through the sacroiliac joints (a) before and (b) after intravenous contrast injection. Enhancement is seen at the right sacroiliac joint (arrow, left side of image), indicating active sacroiliitis. This patient had psoriatic arthritis.

Since sacroiliitis can describe any type of inflammation found within the SI joint, there can be a number of issues that cause it. These include:

- Degenerative arthritis, or osteoarthritis of the spine, can cause degeneration within the joints and lead to inflammation and joint pain.
- Any form of spondyloarthropathies, which includes ankylosing spondylitis, psoriatic arthritis, reactive arthritis or arthritis related to inflammatory bowel diseases, including ulcerative colitis or Crohn's disease.
- Pregnancy can cause inflammation as a result of the widening and stretching of the SI joints to prepare for childbirth. Additionally, the added weight carried during childbearing can put an extra amount of stress on the SI joints, leading to abnormal wear.
- Traumatic injury such as a fall or car crash that affects the lower back, hips, buttocks or legs.
- Though rare, infection within the SI joints or another part of the body, such as a urinary tract infection, can cause inflammation.

== Diagnosis ==
Sacroiliitis can be somewhat difficult to diagnose because the symptoms it manifests can also be caused by other, more common, conditions. If a physician suspects sacroiliitis, they will typically begin their diagnosis by performing a physical exam. Since the condition is axial, they can often pinpoint the affected joint by putting pressure on different places within the legs, hips, spine and buttocks. They may also ask a patient to perform some stretches that will put gentle stress on the SI joints.

X-rays, MRIs and other medical imaging tests can be used to show signs of inflammation and damage within the SI joints. Typically, a spine specialist will order a medical imaging test if they suspect ankylosing spondylitis or another form of arthritis to be the primary cause of inflammation and pain.

== Treatment ==
Treatment can vary depending on the severity of the condition, its cause, and the amount of pain the patient is currently experiencing. However, it typically falls into one of two categories: non-surgical and surgical.

=== Non-surgical ===
In most cases sacroiliitis can be treated without surgery. Often patients will find relief through a combination of rest, heat / ice therapy, physical therapy and anti-inflammatory medication, like ibuprofen. Together these simple treatments help reduce inflammation in the affected SI joints. If the cause is an inflammatory condition such as spondyloarthritis, the treatment may involve NSAIDs or other drugs that are aimed at halting the progression of disease.

For more severe forms of sacroiliitis, SI joint injections might be recommended to help combat symptoms. If chosen, a physician will inject a numbing agent, usually lidocaine, and a steroid containing powerful anti-inflammatory medication into the joint using fluoroscopic guidance. These steroid injections can be delivered up to three or four times a year and should be accompanied with physical therapy to help rehabilitate the affected joint.

=== Surgical ===
Surgery is often the last resort when dealing with sacroiliitis and is rarely required. However, it may be a viable option for patients who are suffering from severe pain that is unresponsive to nonsurgical treatments and is significantly impacting their quality of life. In these cases, a minimally invasive procedure known as Sacroiliac Joint Fusion can effectively stabilize the joint and increase its load-bearing capacity by fusing it together.

=== Experimental ===
Noninvasive treatment based on high-intensity focused ultrasound guided by x-ray fluoroscopy imaging to heat and destroy neural tissue is currently in clinical trial.

== See also ==
- Sacroiliac joint dysfunction
- Surgery for the dysfunctional sacroiliac joint
