= Distal interphalangeal joint =

Distal interphalangeal joints are the articulations between the phalanges of the hand or foot. This term therefore includes:

- Interphalangeal joints of the hand
- Interphalangeal joints of the foot
