= Oligoarthritis =

- Specialty: Rheumatology

Oligoarthritis (from Greek oligos - 'few') is defined as arthritis affecting two to four joints during the first six months of disease.

== Types ==
Two subcategories are recognized:

- Persistent oligoarthritis: Affecting not more than 4 joints throughout the disease course
- Extended oligoarthritis: Affecting a total of more than 4 joints after the first 6 months of disease
