= Spondylitis =

Inflammation of the vertebrae

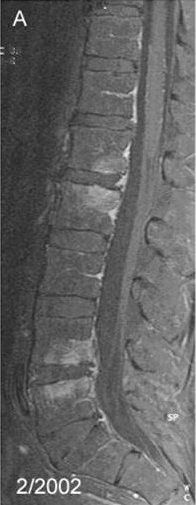
- Spondylitis due to Tropheryma whipplei: Contrast-enhanced, T1 weighted fat suppressed magnetic resonance imaging demonstrating contrast enhancing lesions of spondylitis in the first (L1) and second (L2), as well as fourth (L4) and fifth (L5) lumbar vertebra, sparing the intervertebral discs
- Specialty: Rheumatology
- Diagnostic method: X-ray, MRI, Ultrasonography, blood tests

Spondylitis is an inflammation of the vertebrae. It is a form of spondylopathy. In many cases, spondylitis involves one or more vertebral joints, as well, which itself is called spondylarthritis.

== Types ==
Pott disease is a tuberculous disease of the vertebrae marked by stiffness of the vertebral column, pain on motion, tenderness on pressure, prominence of certain vertebral spines, and occasionally abdominal pain, abscess formation, and paralysis.

Ankylosing spondylitis (AS) is a form of arthritis that primarily affects the spine, although other joints can become involved. It causes inflammation of the spinal joints (vertebrae) that can lead to severe, chronic pain and discomfort. In more advanced cases this inflammation can lead to ankylosis—new bone formation in the spine causing sections of the spine to fuse in a fixed, immobile position.

A combination of spondylitis and inflammation of the intervertebral disc space is termed a spondylodiscitis.
