= Enthesis =

Connective tissue which attaches tendons or ligaments to bones

- Typical joint

Identifiers
- TH: H3.03.00.0.00034

The enthesis (plural entheses) is the connective tissue which attaches tendons or ligaments to a bone.

There are two types of entheses: fibrous entheses and fibrocartilaginous entheses.

In a fibrous enthesis, the collagenous tendon or ligament directly attaches to the bone.

In a fibrocartilaginous enthesis, the interface presents a gradient that crosses four transition zones:

1. Tendinous area displaying longitudinally oriented fibroblasts and a parallel arrangement of collagen fibres
2. Fibrocartilaginous region of variable thickness where the structure of the cells changes to chondrocytes
3. Abrupt transition from cartilaginous to calcified fibrocartilage—often called 'tidemark' or 'blue line'
4. Bone

== Clinical significance ==
A disease of the entheses is known as an enthesopathy or enthesitis.

Enthetic degeneration is characteristic of spondyloarthropathy and other pathologies.

The enthesis is the primary site of disease in ankylosing spondylitis.

== Society and culture ==
=== Bioarchaeology ===
Entheses are widely recorded in the field of bioarchaeology, in which the presence of anomalies at these sites, called entheseal changes, has been used to infer repetitive loading to study the division of labour in past populations. Several different recording methods have been proposed to record the variety of changes seen at these sites. Previous studies have shown that, whichever recording method is used, certain entheseal changes occur more frequently in older individuals. Moreover, research demonstrates that diseases, such as ankylosing spondylitis and calcific tendinitis, also have to be taken into consideration. Nevertheless, experimental laboratory studies relying on virtual anthropological methods of analysis (e.g.,"Validated Entheses-based Reconstruction of Activity" 1.0 and 2.0) have demonstrated how loading history (physical activity) can increase the relative three-dimensional (3D) size of muscle attachment sites and their subtle surface changes.

== History ==
"Enthesis" is rooted in the Ancient Greek word, "ἔνθεσις" or "énthesis," meaning "putting in," or "insertion." This refers to the role of the enthesis as the site of attachment of bones with tendons or ligaments. Relatedly, in muscle terminology, the insertion is the site of attachment at the end with predominant movement or action (opposite of the origin). Thus the words (enthesis and insertion [of muscle]) are proximal in the semantic field, but insertion in reference to muscle can refer to any relevant aspect of the site (i.e., the attachment per se, the bone, the tendon, or the entire area), whereas enthesis refers to the attachment per se and to ligamentous attachments as well as tendinous ones.

== See also ==
- Sharpey's fibres
