= Reactive arthritis =

Inflammatory arthritis triggered by infection elsewhere in the body

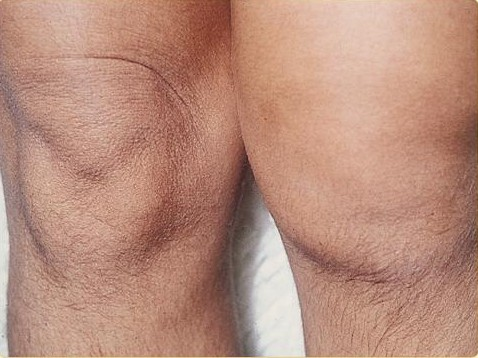
- Reactive arthritis of the knee
- Specialty: Rheumatology
- Frequency: 0.005%

Reactive arthritis, previously known as Reiter's syndrome, is a form of inflammatory arthritis that develops in response to an infection in another part of the body (cross-reactivity). Coming into contact with bacteria and developing an infection can trigger the disease. By the time a person presents with symptoms, the "trigger" infection has often been cured or is in remission in chronic cases, thus making determination of the initial cause difficult.

The manifestations of reactive arthritis include the following triad of symptoms: inflammatory arthritis of large joints, inflammation of the eyes in the form of conjunctivitis or uveitis, and urethritis in men or cervicitis in women. Arthritis occurring alone following sexual exposure or enteric infection is also known as reactive arthritis. Affected people may present with mucocutaneous lesions, as well as psoriasis-like skin lesions such as circinate balanitis, and keratoderma blennorrhagicum. Enthesitis can involve the Achilles tendon resulting in heel pain. Not all affected persons have all the manifestations.

The clinical pattern of reactive arthritis commonly consists of an inflammation of fewer than five joints which often includes the knee or sacroiliac joint. The arthritis may be "additive" (more joints become inflamed in addition to the primarily affected one) or "migratory" (new joints become inflamed after the initially inflamed site has already improved).

As a seronegative spondyloarthropathy, laboratory analysis of blood will show that the patient is rheumatoid factor negative and often HLA-B27 positive. The most common triggers are intestinal infections (with Salmonella, Shigella or Campylobacter) and sexually transmitted infections (with Chlamydia trachomatis); however, it also can happen after group A streptococcal infections.

It most commonly strikes individuals aged 20–40 years of age, is more common in men than in women, and is more common in white than in black people. This is owing to the high frequency of the HLA-B27 gene in the white population. It can occur in epidemic form. Patients with HIV have an increased risk of developing reactive arthritis as well.

Numerous cases during World Wars I and II focused attention on the triad of arthritis, urethritis, and conjunctivitis (often with additional mucocutaneous lesions), which at that time was also referred to as Fiessenger–Leroy–Reiter syndrome.

== Signs and symptoms ==
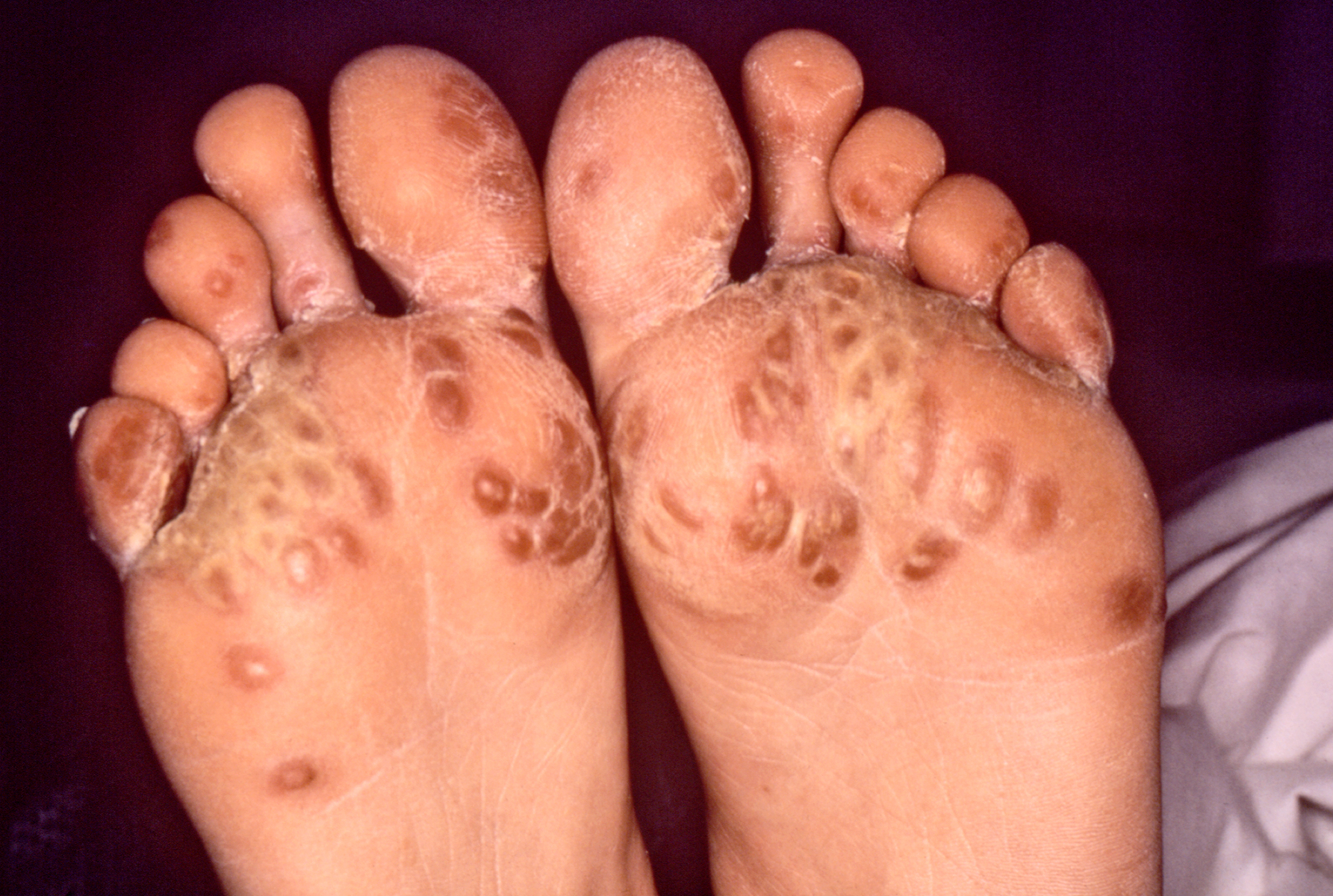
Keratoderma blennorrhagicum due to reactive arthritis

- Because common systems involved include the eye, the urinary system, and the hands and feet, one clinical mnemonic in reactive arthritis is "Can't see, can't pee, can't climb a tree."
- The classic triad consists of:
  - Conjunctivitis
  - Nongonococcal urethritis
  - Asymmetric oligoarthritis
- Symptoms generally appear within 1–3 weeks but can range from 4 to 35 days from the onset of the inciting episode of the disease.
- The classical presentation of the syndrome starts with urinary symptoms such as burning pain on urination (dysuria) or an increased frequency of urination. Other urogenital problems may arise such as prostatitis in men and cervicitis, salpingitis, and/or vulvovaginitis in women.
- It presents with monoarthritis affecting the large joints such as the knees and sacroiliac spine causing pain and swelling. An asymmetrical inflammatory arthritis of interphalangeal joints may be present but with relative sparing of small joints such as the wrist and hand.
- Patient can have enthesitis presenting as heel pain, Achilles tendinitis, or plantar fasciitis, along with balanitis circinata (circinate balanitis), which involves penile lesions present in roughly 20 to 40 percent of the men with the disease.
- A small percentage of men and women develop small hard nodules called keratoderma blennorrhagicum on the soles of the feet and, less commonly, on the palms of the hands or elsewhere. The presence of keratoderma blennorrhagica is diagnostic of reactive arthritis in the absence of the classical triad. Subcutaneous nodules are also a feature of this disease.
- Ocular involvement (mild bilateral conjunctivitis) occurs in about 50% of men with urogenital reactive arthritis syndrome and about 75% of men with enteric reactive arthritis syndrome. Conjunctivitis and uveitis can include redness of the eyes, eye pain and irritation, or blurred vision. Eye involvement typically occurs early in the course of reactive arthritis, and symptoms may come and go.
- Dactylitis, or "sausage digit", a diffuse swelling of a solitary finger or toe, is a distinctive feature of reactive arthritis and other peripheral spondylarthritides but can also be seen in polyarticular gout and sarcoidosis.
- Mucocutaneous lesions can be present. Common findings include oral ulcers that come and go. In some cases, these ulcers are painless and go unnoticed. In the oral cavity, the patients may experience recurrent aphthous stomatitis, geographic tongue, and migratory stomatitis in higher prevalence than the general population.
- Some patients experience serious gastrointestinal problems similar to those of Crohn's disease.
- About 10 percent of people with reactive arthritis, especially those with a prolonged course of the disease, will develop cardiac manifestations, including aortic regurgitation and pericarditis. Reactive arthritis has been described as a precursor of other joint conditions, including ankylosing spondylitis.

== Causes ==
Reactive arthritis is associated with the HLA-B27 gene on chromosome 6 and by the presence of enthesitis as the basic pathologic lesion and is triggered by a preceding infection. The most common triggering infection in the US is a genital infection with Chlamydia trachomatis. Other bacteria known to cause reactive arthritis which are more common worldwide are Ureaplasma urealyticum, Salmonella spp., Shigella spp., Yersinia spp., and Campylobacter spp. A bout of food poisoning or a gastrointestinal infection may also precede the disease (the last four genera of bacteria mentioned above are enteric bacteria). Shigella is the most common organism causing reactive arthritis following diarrhea. Chlamydia trachomatis is the most common cause of reactive arthritis following urethritis. Ureaplasma and mycoplasma are rare causes. There is some circumstantial evidence for other organisms causing the disease, but the details are unclear.

Reactive arthritis usually manifests about 1–3 weeks after a known infection.The interaction between the pathogen and immune system for Reactive Arthritis is part of the innate immune response. The pathogen interacts with synovial cells, usually synovial macrophages. The interaction initiates a response of differentiated CD 80 and CD 86. These go on to activate and regulate T-cell activation. At the same time proinflammatory cytokines are released. During this response toll-like receptors identify the intracellular pathogen to activate cells in innate immune response. After this the activated T-cells are presented with Histocompatibility antigens, activating the autoimmune response. Synovial fluid cultures are negative, suggesting that reactive arthritis is caused either by an autoimmune response involving cross-reactivity of bacterial antigens with joint tissues or by bacterial antigens that have somehow become deposited in the joints.

== Diagnosis ==
There are few clinical symptoms, but the clinical picture is dominated by arthritis in one or more joints, resulting in pain, swelling, redness, and heat sensation in the affected areas.

The urethra, cervix, and the throat may be swabbed in an attempt to culture the causative organisms. Cultures may also be carried out on urine and stool samples or fluid obtained by arthrocentesis.

Tests for C-reactive protein and erythrocyte sedimentation rate are non-specific tests that can be done to corroborate the diagnosis of the syndrome. A blood test for the genetic marker HLA-B27 may also be performed. About 75 percent of all patients with reactive arthritis have this gene.

=== Diagnostic criteria ===
Although there are no definitive criteria to diagnose the existence of reactive arthritis, the American College of Rheumatology has published sensitivity and specificity guidelines.

Percent Sensitivity and Specificity of Various Criteria for Typical Reactive Arthritis
Method of diagnosis	Sensitivity	Specificity
1. An episode of arthritis of more than 1 month with urethritis and/or cervicitis	84.3%	98.2%
2. Episode of arthritis of more than 1 month and either urethritis or cervicitis, or bilateral conjunctivitis	85.5%	96.4%
3. An episode of arthritis, conjunctivitis, and urethritis	50.6%	98.8%
4. An episode of arthritis of more than 1 month, conjunctivitis, and urethritis	48.2%	98.8%

== Treatment ==
The main goal of treatment is to identify and eradicate the underlying infectious source with the appropriate antibiotics if still present. Otherwise, treatment is symptomatic for each problem. Nonspecific urethritis may be treated with a short course of tetracycline. Analgesics, particularly NSAIDs, are used. Steroids, sulfasalazine and immunosuppressants may be needed for patients with severe reactive symptoms that do not respond to any other treatment. Local corticosteroids are useful in the case of iritis.

== Prognosis ==
Reactive arthritis may be self-limiting, frequently recurring, chronic, or progressive. Most patients have severe symptoms lasting a few weeks to six months. 15 to 50 percent of cases involve recurrent bouts of arthritis. Chronic arthritis or sacroiliitis occurs in 15–30 percent of cases. Repeated attacks over many years are common, and patients sometimes end up with chronic and disabling arthritis, heart disease, amyloid deposits, ankylosing spondylitis, immunoglobulin A nephropathy, cardiac conduction abnormalities, or aortitis with aortic regurgitation. However, most people with reactive arthritis can expect to live normal life spans and maintain a near-normal lifestyle with modest adaptations to protect the involved organs.

== Epidemiology ==
Because women may be underdiagnosed, the exact incidence of reactive arthritis is difficult to estimate. A few studies have been completed, though. In Norway between 1988 and 1990, the incidence was 4.6 cases per 100,000 for chlamydia-induced reactive arthritis and 5 cases per 100,000 for that induced by enteric bacteria. In 1978 in Finland, the annual incidence was found to be 43.6 per 100,000.

== History ==
When reactive arthritis appears in a triad that also includes ophthalmic and urogenital manifestations, the eponym "Reiter's syndrome" is often applied; German physician Hans Conrad Julius Reiter described the condition in a soldier he treated during World War I.

Many physicians have suggested that the eponym is undeserved. Reiter's Nazi Party affiliation, and in particular his involvement in forced human experimentation in the Buchenwald concentration camp (which, after his capture at the end of World War II, resulted in his prosecution in Nuremberg as a war criminal), have come to overshadow his medical accomplishments. Furthermore, he was not the first physician to make associations between the arthritis and other symptoms—the names arthritis urethritica, venereal arthritis, and polyarteritis enterica had previously been applied—and the full triad was described by another physician in the 19th century.

== Notable cases ==
- It has been postulated that Italian-born explorer Christopher Columbus had reactive arthritis, dying from a heart attack caused by the condition.
- Pat Buchanan, American conservative political commentator, author, syndicated columnist, politician and broadcaster
- P. J. Gallagher
- Ian Murray, Scottish football player
- Mark St. John, one-time guitarist for Kiss
- Kirk Brandon, lead singer for Spear of Destiny
- Daniel Johns, Australian musician, lead singer for Silverchair
- Steve Walters, football player and survivor of sexual abuse by football trainer Barry Bennell

== See also ==
- List of medical eponyms with Nazi associations
- Lyme disease
