= HLA-B27 =

Type of antigen

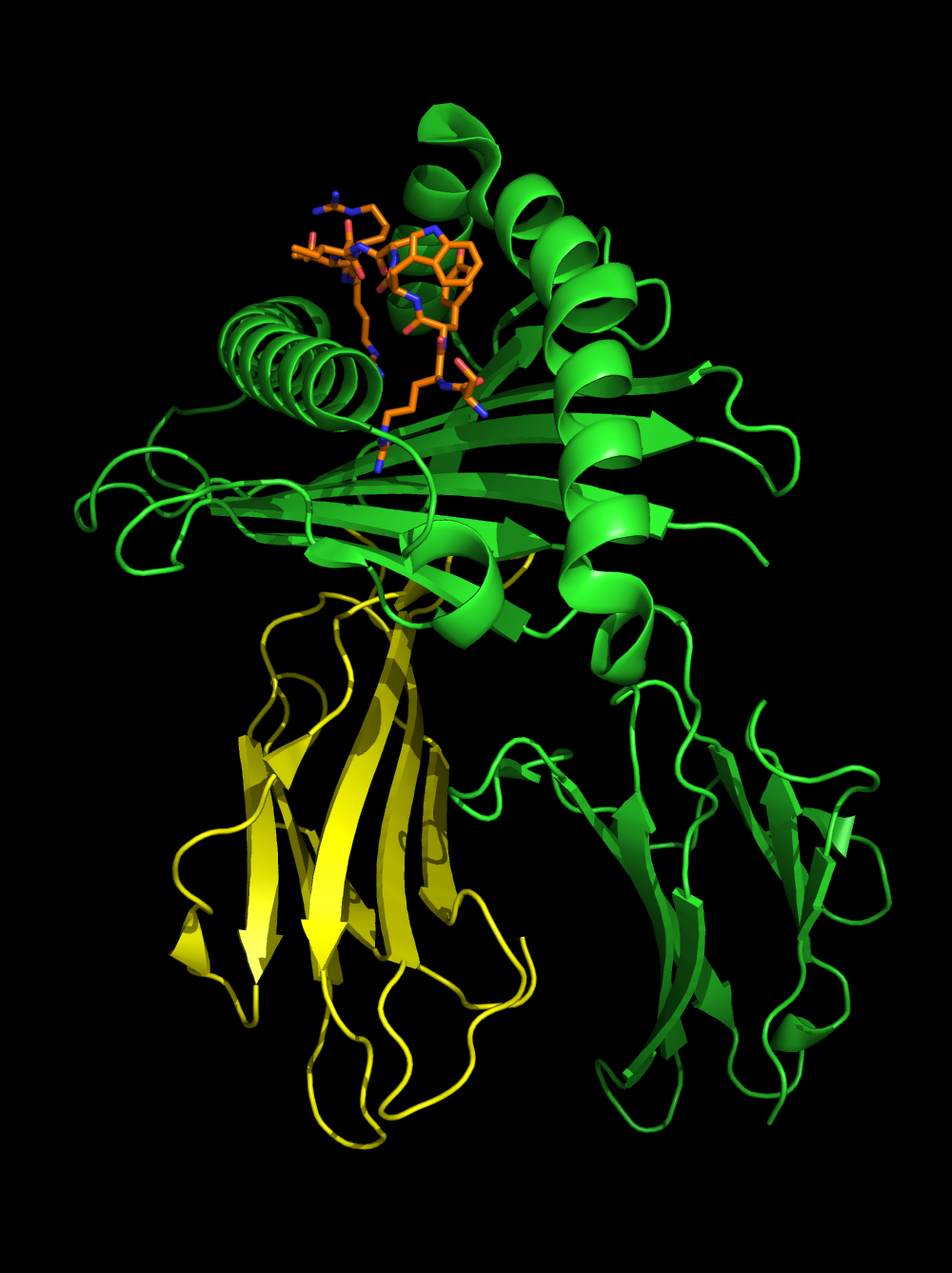
HLA-B*2705-peptide (chain A shown in green cartoon, chain B shown in yellow cartoon) complexed to a fragment of the influenza nucleoprotein NP383-391 (orange, sticks). PDB ID 2BST
B*2705-β2MG with bound peptide 2bst
major histocompatibility complex (human), class I, B27
Alleles	B*2701, 2702, 2703, . . .
Structure (See HLA-B)		Available; 3D structures
EBI-HLA	B*2701
EBI-HLA	B*2702
EBI-HLA	B*2703
EBI-HLA	B*2704
EBI-HLA	B*2705	2bsr, 2bss, 2bst, 2a83, 1w0v, 1uxs, 1ogt, 1hsa, 1jgd, 1jge
EBI-HLA	B*2706
EBI-HLA	B*2709	1w0w, 1uxw, 1of2, 1k5n

Human leukocyte antigen (HLA) B27 (subtypes B*2701-2759) is a class I surface molecule encoded by the B locus in the major histocompatibility complex (MHC) on chromosome 6 and presents antigenic peptides (derived from self and non-self antigens) to T cells. HLA-B27 is strongly associated with ankylosing spondylitis and other associated inflammatory diseases, such as psoriatic arthritis, inflammatory bowel disease, and reactive arthritis.

== Prevalence ==
The prevalence of HLA-B27 varies markedly in the global population.

In the United States, the estimated prevalence is 6-8%. 4% of North Africans, 2–9% of Chinese, and 0.1–0.5% of persons of Japanese descent possess the gene that codes for this antigen. Among the Sami in Northern Scandinavia (Sápmi), 24% of people are HLA-B27 positive, while 1.8% have associated ankylosing spondylitis, compared to 14-16% of Northern Scandinavians in general. In Finland, an estimated 14% of the population is positive for HLA-B27, while more than 95% of patients with ankylosing spondylitis and approximately 70–80% of patients with reactive arthritis have the genetic marker.

== Disease associations ==
The vast majority of patients with positive HLA-B27 will not develop an associated syndrome.

The relationship between HLA-B27 and many diseases has not yet been fully elucidated. Though HLA-B27 is associated with a wide range of pathology, it does not appear to be the sole mediator in the development of disease.

90% of people with ankylosing spondylitis (AS) are HLA-B27 positive, although only a small fraction of people with HLA-B27 will develop AS. People who are HLA-B27 positive are more likely to experience early onset AS than HLA-B27 negative individuals. Research is uncovering other genes that predispose to AS and associated diseases, and there are potential environmental factors that may play a role in susceptible individuals.

Approximately 40–50% of individuals with psoriatic arthritis have the HLA-B27 genotype.

HLA-B27 is implicated in other types of seronegative spondyloarthropathy, such as reactive arthritis, acute anterior uveitis, iritis, Crohn's disease, and ulcerative colitis associated spondyloarthritis. The shared association with HLA-B27 leads to increased clustering of these diseases.

HLA antigens have been studied in relation to autism.

=== Pathological mechanism ===
HLA-B27 is the most researched HLA-B allele due to its high relationship with spondyloarthropathies. Although it is not apparent how HLA-B27 promotes disease, theories exist and can be divided between antigen-dependent and antigen-independent categories.

==== Antigen-dependent theories ====
These theories consider a specific combination of antigen peptide sequence and the binding groove (B pocket) of HLA-B27 (which will have different properties from the other HLA-B alleles). The arthritogenic peptide hypothesis suggests that HLA-B27 has a unique ability to bind antigens from a microorganism that triggers a CD8 T-cell response that cross-reacts with a HLA-B27/self-peptide pair. HLA-B27 can bind peptides at the cell surface. The molecular mimicry hypothesis is similar, although it suggests that cross-reactivity between some bacterial antigens and self-peptides can break tolerance and lead to autoimmunity.

==== Antigen-independent theories ====
Antigen-independent theories refer to the biochemical properties of HLA-B27. The misfolding hypothesis suggests that slow folding during HLA-B27's tertiary structure folding and association with β2 microglobulin causes the protein to be misfolded, initiating the unfolded protein response (UPR), a pro-inflammatory endoplasmic reticulum (ER) stress response. Although this mechanism has been demonstrated in vitro and in animals, there is little evidence of its occurrence in human spondyloarthritis. The HLA-B27 heavy chain homodimer formation hypothesis suggests that B27 heavy chains tend to dimerise and accumulate in the ER, initiating the UPR. Cell surface B27 heavy chains and dimers can bind to regulatory immune receptors such as members of the killer cell immunoglobulin-like receptor family, promoting the survival and differentiation of pro-inflammatory leukocytes in disease.

Another misfolding theory published in 2004 proposes that β2 microglobulin-free heavy chains of HLA-B27 undergo a facile conformational change in which the C-terminal end of domain two, consisting of a long helix, becomes subject to a helix-coil transition involving residues 169–181 of the heavy chain, owing to the conformational freedom newly experienced by domain three of the heavy chain when there is no longer any bound light chain, and owing to the consequent rotation around the backbone dihedral angles of residues 167/168. The proposed conformational transition is thought to allow the newly-generated coiled region (incorporating residues 'RRYLENGKETLQR' which have also been found to be naturally bound to HLA-B27 as a 9-mer peptide) to bind to either the peptide-binding cleft of the same polypeptide chain (in an act of self-display) or to the cleft of another polypeptide chain (in an act of cross-display). Cross-display is proposed to lead to the formation of large, soluble, high molecular weight (HMW), degradation-resistant, long-surviving aggregates of the HLA-B27 heavy chain. Together with any homodimers formed either by cross-display or by a disulfide-linked homodimerization mechanism, it is proposed that such HMW aggregates survive on the cell surface without undergoing rapid degradation, and stimulate an immune response. Three previously noted features of HLA-B27, which distinguish it from other heavy chains, underlie the hypothesis: (1) HLA-B27 has been found to be bound to peptides longer than 9-mers, suggesting that the cleft can accommodate a longer polypeptide chain; (2) HLA-B27 has been found to itself contain a sequence that has also been actually discovered to be bound to HLA-B27, as an independent peptide; and (3) HLA-B27 heavy chains lacking β2 microglobulin have been seen on cell surfaces.

=== HIV long-term nonprogressors ===
About 1 in 500 people infected with HIV can remain symptom-free for many years without medication, a group known as long-term nonprogressors. The presence of HLA-B27, as well as HLA-B5701, is significantly common among this group.

== See also ==
- Human leukocyte antigen
