= Dactylitis =

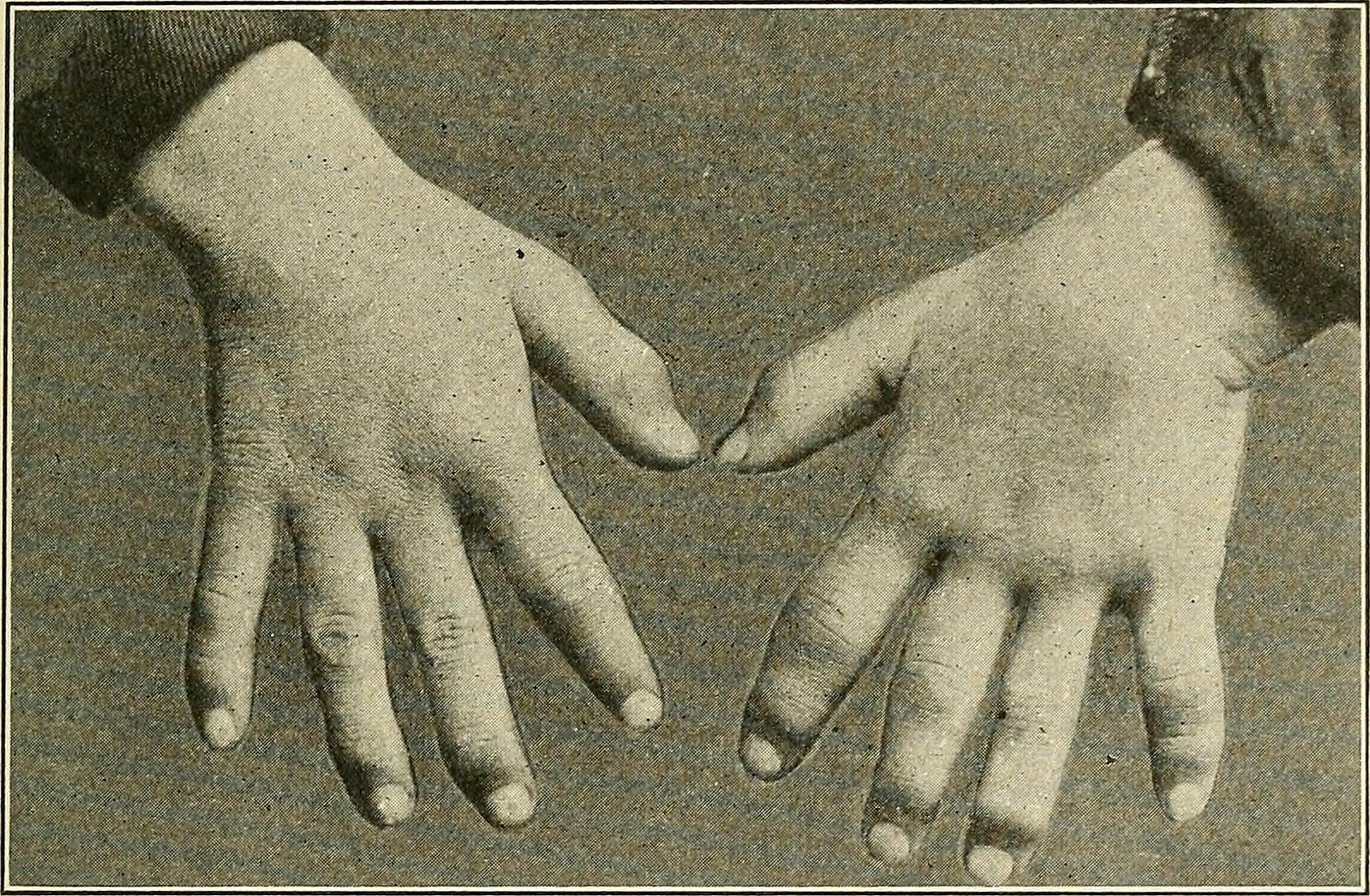
- Syphilitic dactylitis

Dactylitis or sausage digit is inflammation of an entire digit (a finger or toe), and can be painful.

The word dactyl comes from the Greek word daktylos 'finger'. As a medical term, it refers to both the fingers and the toes.

== Associated conditions ==
Dactylitis can occur in seronegative arthropathies, such as psoriatic arthritis and ankylosing spondylitis, and in sickle-cell disease as result of a vasoocclusive crisis with bone infarcts, and in infectious conditions including tuberculosis, syphilis, and leprosy. In reactive arthritis, sausage fingers occur due to synovitis. Dactylitis may also be seen with sarcoidosis.

In sickle-cell disease it typically occurs after 6 months of age (as in infants protective fetal hemoglobin, HbF, is replaced with adult hemoglobin and the disease manifests) and is often the first clinical presentation of the disorder.
