= Enthesitis =

Inflammation where tendons and ligaments attach to bones

- Typical joint showing the entheses
- Specialty: Rheumatology

Enthesitis is inflammation of the entheses (singular: enthesis), the sites where tendons, ligaments and joint capsules attach to bones.

It is a type of enthesopathy, meaning any pathologic condition of the entheses, with or without inflammation. There are some cases of isolated, primary enthesitis which are very poorly studied and understood. It is known to be associated with other autoimmune diseases, like spondyloarthropathies and psoriasis (thought to often precede psoriatic arthritis). A common autoimmune enthesitis is at the heel, where the Achilles tendon attaches to the calcaneus.

It is associated with HLA B27 arthropathies, such as ankylosing spondylitis, psoriatic arthritis, and reactive arthritis.

== Signs and symptoms ==
Early clinical manifestations are an aching sensation akin to "working out too much", and it gets better with activity. It is worse in the morning (after sleeping and not moving). The muscle insertion hurts very focally as it joins into the bone, but there is little to no pain at all with passive motion.

Symptoms include multiple points of tenderness at the heel, tibial tuberosity, iliac crest, and other tendon insertion sites.

== Diagnosis ==
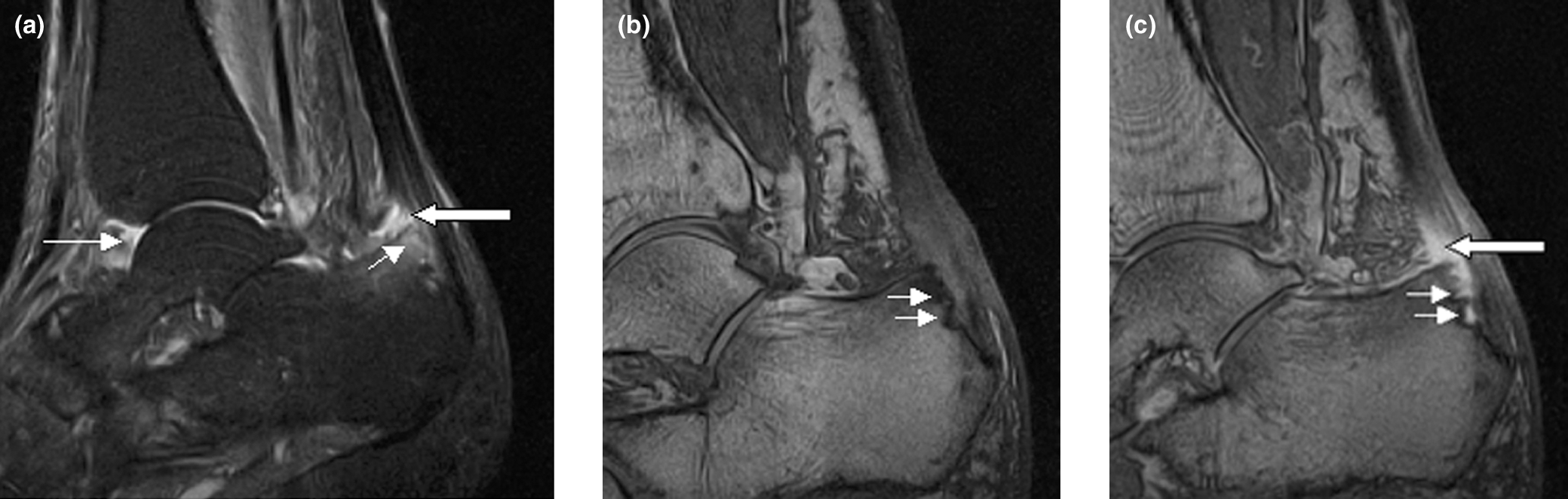
Sagittal magnetic resonance images of ankle region: psoriatic arthritis. (a) Short tau inversion recovery (STIR) image, showing high signal intensity at the Achilles tendon insertion (enthesitis, thick arrow) and in the synovium of the ankle joint (synovitis, long thin arrow). Bone marrow oedema is seen at the tendon insertion (short thin arrow). (b, c) T1 weighted images of a different section of the same patient, before (panel b) and after (panel c) intravenous contrast injection, confirm inflammation (large arrow) at the enthesis and reveal bone erosion at tendon insertion (short thin arrows).

== Management ==
- Nonsteroidal anti-inflammatory drugs (NSAIDs).
- Corticosteroid injections.
- Disease-modifying antirheumatic drug (DMARD).

== Related conditions ==
Anatomically close but separate conditions are:

- Apophysitis, inflammation of the bony attachment, generally associated with overuse among growing children.
- Tendinopathy is a disorder of the tendon, and is associated with direct injury or repetitive activities.
