= Rheumatoid nodulosis =

- Other names: Accelerated rheumatoid nodulosis
- Specialty: Dermatology

Rheumatoid nodulosis is a cutaneous condition associated with rheumatoid arthritis, characterized by the appearance of multiple nodules, most often on the hands.

== Signs and symptoms ==
The classic description of rheumatoid nodulosis in adults is that it is a variation of rheumatoid arthritis (RA) that appears as a proliferation of subcutaneous nodules, frequently on the hands and feet, linked to palindromic rheumatism without loss of joint function and with minimal to no systemic symptoms.

== Mechanism ==
There are numerous theories regarding the pathophysiology of nodules linked to RA, and none of them are entirely accepted. Some have hypothesised that minor local trauma to small blood vessels induces nodules by causing rheumatoid factor-containing immune complexes to pool. It is believed that these immune complexes cause the release of chemotactic factors by activating nearby macrophages. More macrophages are drawn in by this process, which ultimately results in the formation of granulomas with central necrosis. Some have proposed theories regarding the role of underlying vasculitis or genetic factors in the development of RA nodules.

== Treatment ==
Generally, there is no need for treatment for the lesions; however, on rare occasions, nonsteroidal anti-inflammatory medications or intralesional corticosteroids may be necessary. In patients with severe local discomfort who are highly symptomatic, resection may be an option.

== Epidemiology ==
About 20% of people with rheumatoid arthritis develop rheumatoid nodules, which are linked to more severe erosive disease in those patients. The nodules are more common in men, typically manifest in the fifth decade of life, and are primarily found on extensor surfaces like the backs of the fingers and elbows, though they can occur anywhere.

== See also ==
- Rheumatoid neutrophilic dermatitis
- Rheumatoid nodule
- List of cutaneous conditions
