= Idiopathic facial aseptic granuloma =

- Specialty: Dermatology

Idiopathic facial aseptic granuloma is a cutaneous condition characterized by a chronic, painless, solitary nodule, reminiscent of an acne nodule, appearing on the cheeks of young children. It has a prolonged course, but spontaneously heals.

== Signs and symptoms ==
Idiopathic facial aseptic granuloma is defined by persistent, painless, reddish-violet nodules on the face that have an elastic or soft consistency. The nodules usually appears alone, usually on the cheeks or eyelids, and goes away on its own after an average of 11 months.

== Causes ==
Idiopathic facial aseptic granuloma's pathogenesis is still unknown, however some writers have suggested that it might be related to the childhood rosacea spectrum.

== Diagnosis ==
Idiopathic facial aseptic granuloma is diagnosed clinically, though color Doppler ultrasonography can be helpful. This displays a well-defined, hypoechoic, solid-cystic dermal lesion without any calcium deposits; the lesion's largest axis is parallel to the skin's surface.

== See also ==
- Granulomatous facial dermatitis
- List of cutaneous conditions
