= Rheumatoid neutrophilic dermatitis =

- Specialty: Dermatology

Rheumatoid neutrophilic dermatitis, also known as rheumatoid neutrophilic dermatosis, is a cutaneous condition associated with rheumatoid arthritis.

== Signs and symptoms ==
Rheumatoid neutrophilic dermatitis occurs more frequently in patients with severe, persistent seropositive arthritis; it presents clinically as erythematous papules, nodules, plaques, or lesions resembling urticaria without any accompanying symptoms. Less common conditions include annular lesions, blisters, ulcers, and vesicles. Skin lesions are typically symmetrical, but they can occasionally be distributed asymmetrically. Dorsal surfaces of hands and arms are preferred sites, with an emphasis on the extensor surfaces of extremities and joints.

== Diagnosis ==
Histopathological findings include normal epidermis, that may show hyperkeratosis, parakeratosis, focal ulceration with scaly crust, or spongiosis with intraepidermal blistering,

== Treatment ==
Treatments include topical steroids, cyclophosphamide, dapsone, and hydroxychloroquine.

== Outlook ==
Lesion resolution can happen on its own or as the rheumatoid arthritis progresses, but lesions usually recur when the condition gets worse. Although most lesions heal without leaving scars, hyperpigmentation may linger for a while.

== See also ==
- Sweet's syndrome-like dermatosis
- List of cutaneous conditions
