= Bowel-associated dermatosis–arthritis syndrome =

- Other names: Bowel bypass syndrome and Intestinal bypass arthritis–dermatitis syndrome
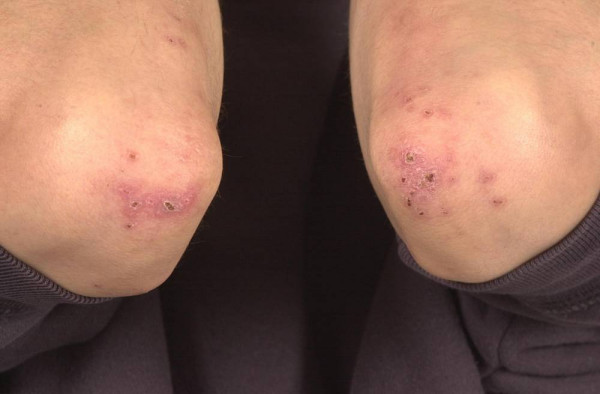
- Pustules and crusts around the elbows in a patient with Crohn's disease and bowel-associated dermatosis-arthritis syndrome (BADAS)
- Specialty: Dermatology

Bowel-associated dermatosis–arthritis syndrome (BADAS), is a complication of jejunoileal bypass surgery consisting of flu-like symptoms (fever, malaise), multiple painful joints (polyarthralgia), muscle aches (myalgia) and skin changes. It has been reported to occur in up to 20% of patients who had jejunoileal bypass surgery, a form of obesity surgery that is rarely performed today.

An excessive immune response to gut bacteria is thought to cause BADAS. Antibiotics have been used successfully to treat the condition (including tetracyclines, macrolides, metronidazole and fluoroquinolones). Corticosteroids are an alternative. Surgical repair of the normal bowel transit, where possible, can be effective.

BADAS has later been reported in patients with inflammatory bowel disease, diverticulitis and following resection of the stomach (gastrectomy). BADAS has also been reported following biliopancreatic diversion (a form of bariatric surgery, also known as Scopinaro procedure), and in one case, BADAS occurred in a patient with acute appendicitis. Since "bowel bypass syndrome" is not applicable to these cases, the term "bowel-associated dermatosis–arthritis syndrome" was coined by Jorizzo and co-authors in 1984.

== Signs and symptoms ==
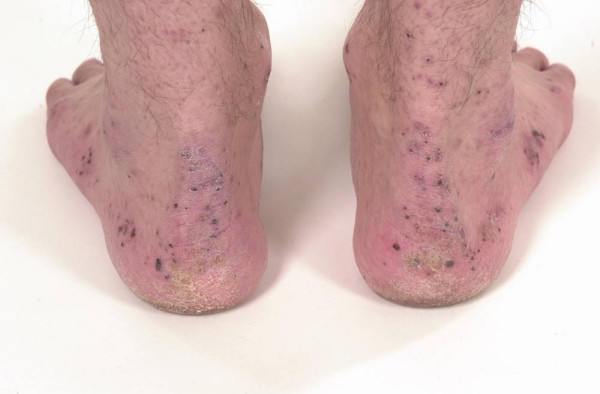
Crusts around the ankles and feet in the same patient as above

The most typical skin changes are a red patch (erythematous macula) with a central vesicle or pustule that heals without scarring. This maculopapular rash can recur every 4–6 weeks and predominantly affect the upper chest and arms. Erythema nodosum-like skin lesions can affect the legs. When a skin biopsy is examined under the microscope, there can be signs of a neutrophilic dermatosis. The joint pains in BADAS are typically episodic, migratory and affecting multiple joints. They can affect the small joints (e.g. interphalangeal joints of the fingers) and there can be associated tenosynovitis, but there is no erosion or deformation in the long term.

Diarrhea may also occur.

== Mechanism ==
Immune complexes are thought to cause blood vessel damage, attracting neutrophils into the skin and synovium in BADAS. These antigen-antibody complexes are thought to be caused by excessive exposure to bacterial antigens (especially peptidoglycans). Bacterial overgrowth appears to be a frequent underlying condition. These antibodies possibly stimulate migration of neutrophils into the affected joints and skin. The effect of antibacterial therapy supports a role for bacteria in the disease mechanism (pathogenesis).

== Diagnosis ==
A diagnosis of this syndrome is made when an individual has the constellation of the characteristic recurrent neutrophilic dermatosis, flu-like symptoms, arthralgias or arthritis, and myalgias in the setting of a pathology of the bowels that is not best explained by another diagnosis.

== See also ==
- Sweet's syndrome-like dermatosis
- List of cutaneous conditions
