= Recurrent palmoplantar hidradenitis =

- Other names: Idiopathic palmoplantar hidradenitis, Idiopathic plantar hidradenitis, Painful plantar erythema, Palmoplantar eccrine hidradenitis, Plantar panniculitis
- Specialty: Dermatology

Recurrent palmoplantar hidradenitis, also known as idiopathic palmoplantar hidradenitis, idiopathic plantar hidradenitis, painful plantar erythema, palmoplantar eccrine hidradenitis, and plantar panniculitis, is primarily a disorder of healthy children and young adults, characterized by lesions that are primarily painful, subcutaneous nodules on the plantar surface, resembling erythema nodosum.

Although the cause of recurrent palmoplantar hidradenitis is unknown some theories involve trauma, moisture, physical activity, vibration, perspiration, infections, vaccinations, and hypersensitivity reactions.

Diagnosis can be made based on clinical features and confirmed by a skin biopsy. Recurrent palmoplantar hidradenitis is usually benign and does not require any specific treatment.

== Signs and symptoms ==
Recurrent palmoplantar hidradenitis often manifests as suddenly developing sensitive, erythematous nodules on the plantar surface that cause pain when walking; on rare occasions, recurrent palmoplantar hidradenitis can also cause pustules and damage to the palms. Although systemic symptoms are typically absent, there have been a few documented cases when a low-grade fever was present.

== Causes ==
Recurrent palmoplantar hidradenitis's pathophysiology is yet unclear. However, prior research has put forth a number of theories, such as local mechanical or thermal trauma; moisture; intense physical activity; vibration; pedal perspiration; recent infections, particularly streptococcal ones; recent vaccinations; hypersensitivity reactions; and Pseudomonas infection of mechanically stressed areas of the skin, particularly the soles, which may serve as a portal of entry to the eccrine glands.

== Mechanism ==
The eccrine glands of juvenile patients may be functionally immature and thus easily harmed by increases in temperature, mechanical trauma, and friction, according to certain writers who have documented a higher incidence of recurrent palmoplantar hidradenitis during the spring and summer seasons. Eventually, these assaults cause eccrine gland rupture, which releases sweat into surrounding tissues. This triggers inflammation, which in turn triggers neutrophil recruitment.

== Diagnosis ==
The most reliable method for diagnosing recurrent palmoplantar hidradenitis is skin biopsy. A biopsy is typically not required for diagnosis, though, given the typical clinical presentation of recurrent palmoplantar hidradenitis, with the exception of individuals with an unusually long duration or atypical presentation. A histopathologic examination will show that the inflammatory infiltration surrounding the eccrine sweat glands is mostly neutrophilic.

== Treatment ==
Since recurrent palmoplantar hidradenitis has a benign course, it is imperative to get a precise diagnosis in order to prevent unnecessary therapy. Bed rest should be the primary focus of management in order to reduce sweating and the ensuing inflammation. Without any kind of treatment, almost all documented cases of recurrent palmoplantar hidradenitis resolved entirely after 4 weeks.

== See also ==
- List of cutaneous conditions
- Hidradenitis
