= Hidradenitis =

- Specialty: Dermatology

Hidradenitis is any disease in which the histologic abnormality is primarily an inflammatory infiltrate around the eccrine glands. This group includes neutrophilic eccrine hidradenitis and recurrent palmoplantar hidradenitis.

It can also be defined more generally as an inflammation of sweat glands.

Hidradenitis suppurativa is a chronic cutaneous condition originally thought to be primarily characterized by suppurative inflammation of the apocrine sweat glands. Recent evidence supports that the primary event is follicular hyperkeratosis and obstruction, but the term hidradenitis supperativa has continued to be used in major medical journals.

== Symptoms ==
Hidradenitis suppurativa is a chronic inflammatory skin condition, considered a member of the acne family of disorders. It is sometimes called acne inversa. The first signs of HS are small bumps on the skin that resemble pimples, cysts, boils, or folliculitis. As the disease progresses and abscesses reoccur, they become larger and more painful; eventually tunnels of scar tissue connect the lesions. These lesions may open up if they become too enlarged and drain bloodstained pus.

== Risk factor ==
One risk factor is age; HS usually starts after puberty, usually in the teens and twenties. The condition is much more common in women than in men but is usually more serious and debilitating in men. Other associated conditions include obesity, diabetes, metabolic syndrome, arthritis, acne, and other inflammatory disorders. Early diagnosis of this disease is very important to decrease the number of flares, pain, and discomfort.

== Treatment ==
The Mayo Clinic suggests the following: antibiotics (generally the lowest side effect profile compared to other treatments); corticosteroids (e.g., prednisone); but corticosteroids have many side effects, including "moon face" for the duration of the medication's trial usage, as well as unwanted hair growth for females and/or osteoporosis with long-term use. Tumor necrosis factor (TNF)-alpha inhibitors like infliximab (Remicade) and adalimumab (Humira) have shown promise for some, but they should probably be considered a third-line treatment, as treatment is associated with increased risk of infection, heart failure and certain cancers. Surgery is also available for those overwhelmed by the condition, but it will not cure the condition, just relieve the skin-related issues for a while. The disease is pernicious and is almost always guaranteed to return, if not in the same spot where the surgery was performed.

Some products for adult acne may help relieve some symptoms for people with hidradenitis, although there is no guarantee it will work in all or even most individuals. Birth control medication may relieve some symptoms for women; there is a hormonal treatment for men as well, but that has not been proven to be safe or effective as of yet.

Alternative treatments not approved by the FDA include alpha hydroxy acids (naturally available in small amounts in citrus fruits), Azelaic acid, and zinc. It is not thought that they are as effective as standard medical treatment, but they tend to have less side effects. Some suggest tea tree oil and a specific strain of brewer's yeast, called CBS 5926. However, tea tree oil can cause contact dermatitis for some as well as breast development in teenage boys and should not be used if one has rosacea due to the potentiality of worsening the symptoms of that skin condition. CBS 5962 can also cause migraines and intestinal issues for some.

== See also ==
- Hidradenitis suppurativa
