= Large-cell acanthoma =

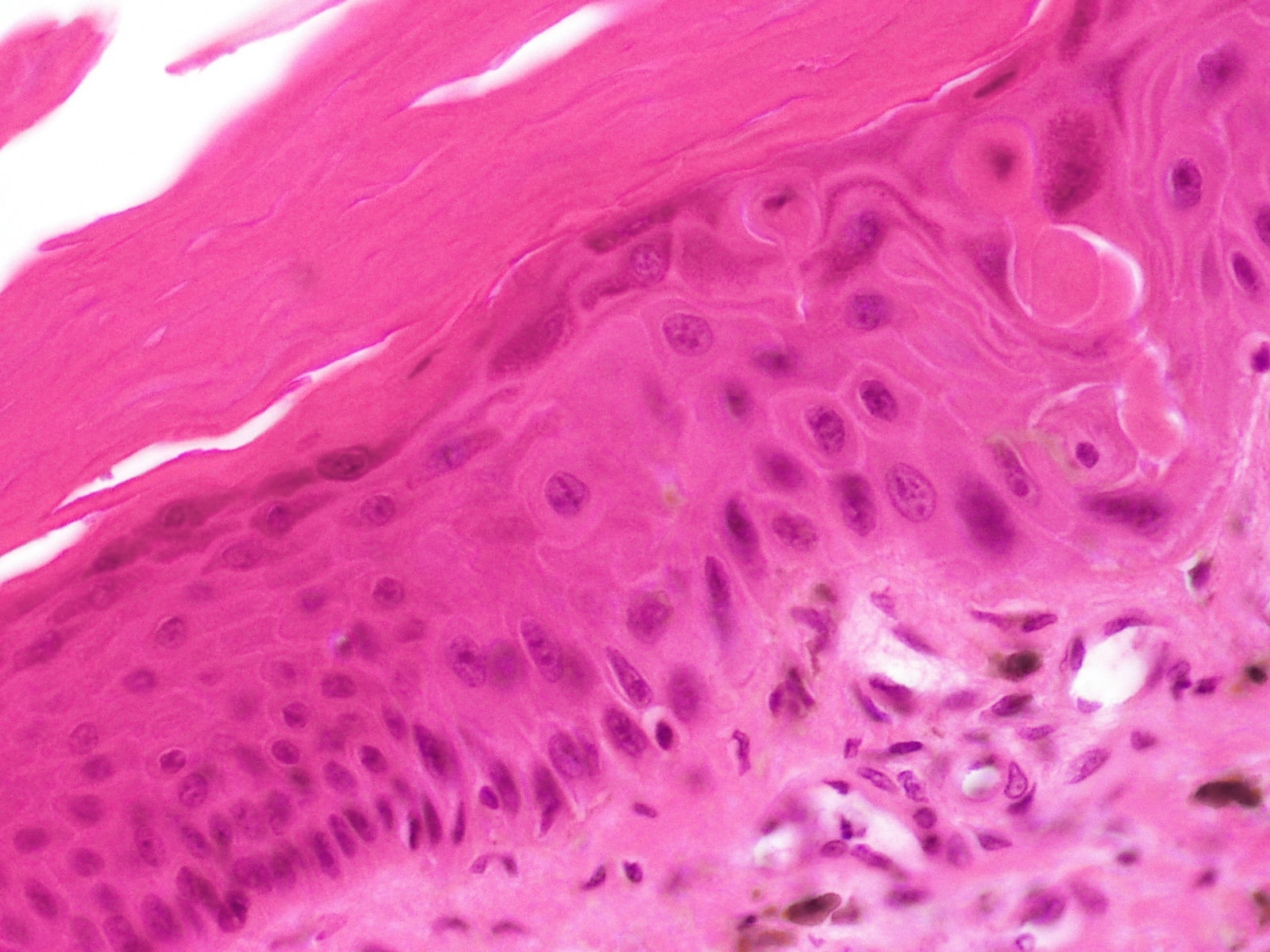
- Large-cell acanthoma
- Specialty: Dermatology

Large-cell acanthomas are a cutaneous condition characterized by small, skin-colored, hyper- or hypopigmented papules or plaques.

== See also ==
- Clear cell acanthoma
- List of cutaneous conditions
