= Neutrophilic lobular panniculitis =

- Specialty: Dermatology

Neutrophilic lobular panniculitis is a cutaneous condition characterized by inflammation of the subcutaneous fat.

== See also ==
- Bowel-associated dermatosis–arthritis syndrome
- List of cutaneous conditions
