= Dermatofibroma =

Benign nodule in the skin

- Other names: Dermal dendrocytoma, Dermatofibroma, Fibrous dermatofibroma, Fibrous histiocytoma, Fibroma simplex, Nodular subepidermal fibrosis, and Sclerosing hemangioma)
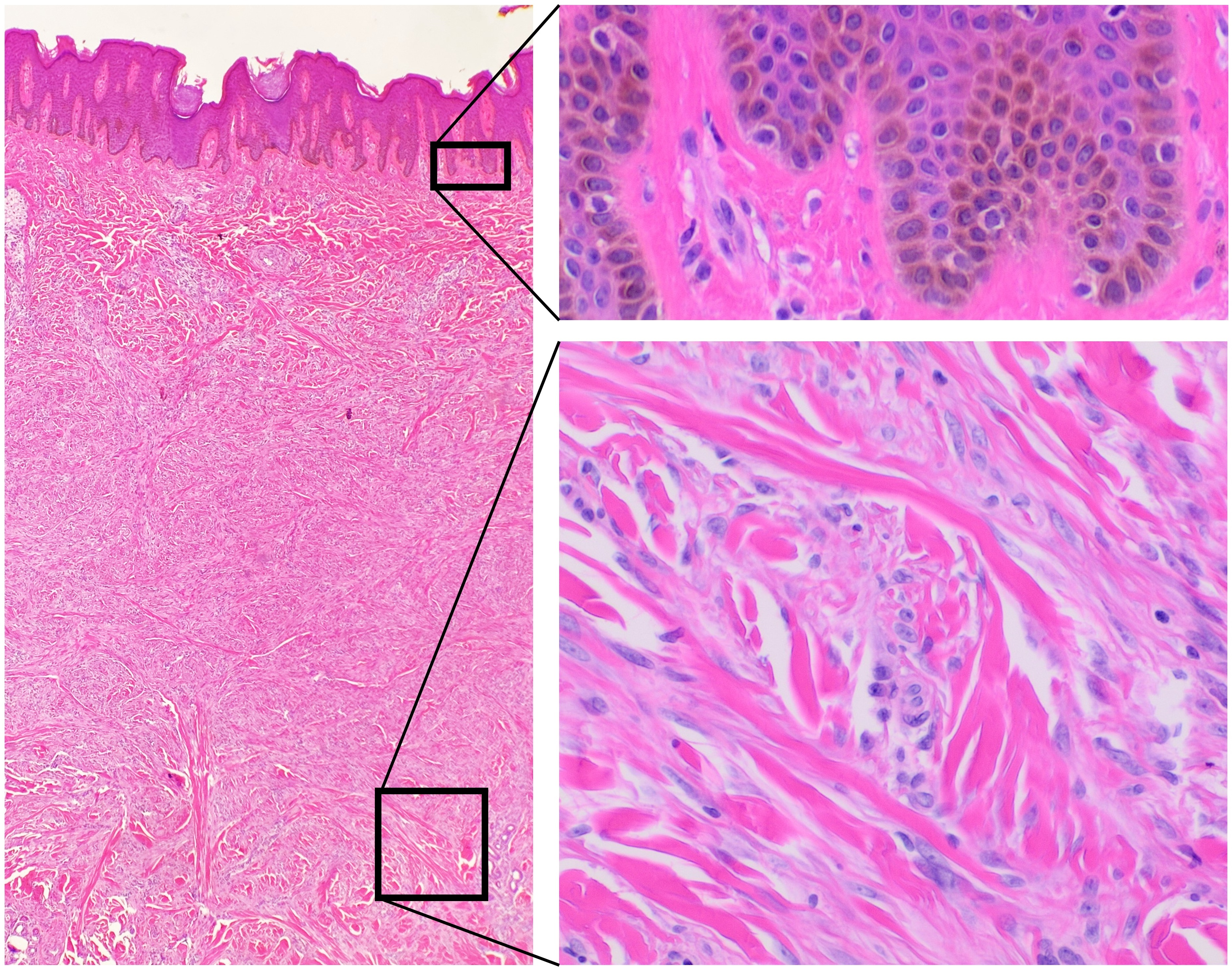
- Histopathology of dermatofibroma, with basilar hyperpigmentation of the overlying epidermis (top right), and spindled fibroblasts with collagen entrapment. HE stain.
- Specialty: Oncology

A dermatofibroma, or benign fibrous histiocytoma, is a benign nodule in the skin, typically on the legs, elbows or chest of an adult. It is usually painless.

It usually ranges from 0.2 to 2 cm in size but larger examples have been reported. It typically results from mild trauma such as an insect bite. Risk factors for developing multiple dermatofibromas include lupus, HIV, blood cancer and some medicines that weaken immunity.

It is usually diagnosed by its appearance, but a biopsy may be required. Other bumps such as granular cell tumor, melanoma, clear cell acanthoma and dermatofibrosis lenticularis disseminata may look similar. Usually no treatment is needed. It can remain unchanged for years but can resolve spontaneously.

== Signs and symptoms ==
Dermatofibromas are hard solitary slow-growing papules (rounded bumps) that appear in a variety of colours, usually brownish to tan. They are often elevated or pedunculated. A dermatofibroma is associated with the dimple sign; by applying lateral pressure, there is a central depression of the dermatofibroma. Although typical dermatofibromas cause little or no discomfort, itching and tenderness can occur. Dermatofibromas can be found anywhere on the body, but most often they are found on the legs and arms. They occur more often in women; the male to female ratio is about 1:4. The age group in which they most commonly occur is 20 to 45 years.

Some physicians and researchers believe dermatofibromas form as a reaction to previous injuries such as insect bites or thorn pricks. They are composed of disordered collagen laid down by fibroblasts. Dermatofibromas are classed as benign skin lesions, meaning they are completely harmless, though they may be confused with a variety of subcutaneous tumours. Deep penetrating dermatofibromas may be difficult to distinguish, even histologically, from rare malignant fibrohistocytic tumours like dermatofibrosarcoma protuberans.

Dermatofibromas typically have a positive buttonhole sign, or central dimpling in the center.

== Diagnosis ==
=== Immunohistochemical staining ===
| Neoplasm | CD34 | Stromelysin-3 | Factor XIIIa |
|---|---|---|---|
| Dermatofibroma | - | + | + |
| Dermatofibrosarcoma protuberans | + | - | - |

== See also ==
- Acrochordon, also called skin tags
- Dermatology
- List of cutaneous conditions
- Seborrheic keratosis
