= Dimple sign =

Dermatological sign

The dimple sign or Fitzpatrick's sign is a dermatological sign in which lateral pressure on the skin produces a depression. It is associated with dermatofibroma.
