= Rheumatoid disease of the spine =

- Other names: Atlantoaxial joint disease in rheumatoid arthritis, atlantoaxial instability of rheumatoid arthritis, cervical subluxation in rheumatoid arthritis
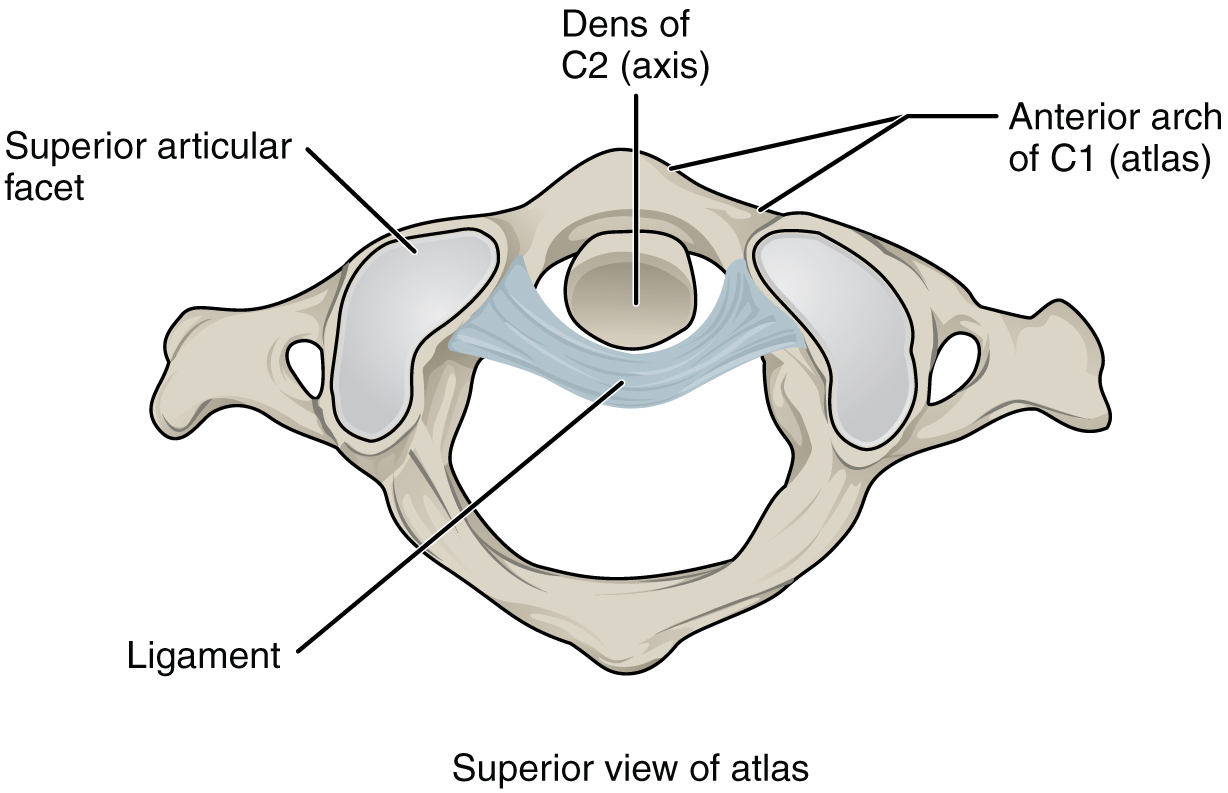
- Specialty: Rheumatology

Rheumatoid disease of the spine is a morbid consequence of untreated longstanding severe cervical spinal rheumatoid arthritis (RA)–an inflammatory autoimmune disease that attacks the ligaments, joints, and bones of the neck. Although the anterior subluxation of the atlantoaxial joint is the most common manifestation of the disorder, subluxation can also occur with posterior or vertical movement, and subaxial (below C2) joints can also be involved.

== Signs and symptoms ==
Atlantoaxial instability is a common asymptomatic finding in rheumatoid arthritis patients. However, it can lead to cervical myelopathy. Patients with atlantoaxial instability can experience neck pain and headaches in the back of the head (occipital headaches). Myelopathic symptoms include: weakness, gait disturbance, paresthesias, and loss of dexterity (e.g. difficulty buttoning clothing).

== Causes ==
The inflammatory mediators of RA including cytokines, growth factors, metalloproteinases destroy articular cartilage, subchondral bone, tendons and ligaments. Destructive synovitis leads to bone erosion and causes the ligaments of the spine to become too laxed (loose), eventually resulting in cervical spinal instability (loose neck bones).

== Diagnosis ==
=== Physical exam ===
On palpation, the examiner may find crepitus at the neck joint and unstable movement including a positive "clunk test" (palpable subluxation). Lhermitte's sign may be elicited with head flexion.

=== Imaging ===
As many as 50% of people with radiographic instability are actually asymptomatic. Initial radiography should include flexion and extension lateral X-rays in addition to static anterior/posterior and lateral views. These views are often repeated every 2–3 years, especially in patients with new symptoms or possibly requiring future intubation. Progression of disease is measured via anterior atlantodental interval (AADI), and posterior atlantodental interval (PADI). Other techniques include the Ranawat Index, MacGregor Line, the Clark stations, and the Redlund-Johnell measurement.

== Management ==
Up to 10% of patients with rheumatoid arthritis are at risk of sudden death due to unrecognized cord compression. Thus surgical intervention is a reasonable choice in the presence of a neurologic deficit as a result of instability. In fact, early surgery for atlantoaxial subluxation may actually delay the debilitating progress of myelopathy.
