= Augustin Jacob Landré-Beauvais =

French surgeon

Augustin Jacob Landré-Beauvais (1772–1840) was a French surgeon best known for his description of rheumatoid arthritis. Born in Orléans, he studied under Pierre-Joseph Desault and Xavier Bichat in Paris, and then from 1792 under Marc-Antoine Petit (1766-1811) in Lyon. In 1796, he obtained an internship at the famed Salpêtrière Hospital, where he assisted Philippe Pinel. He was appointed professor of clinical medicine at the Salpêtrière in 1799. After the restoration, he also held the professorship at the Paris polytechnic school. He was removed in 1830 at the insistence of King Louis-Philippe of France.

His description of rheumatoid arthritis, now regarded as the first modern-day account of the disease, incorrectly identified it as a form of gout. Before Landré-Beauvais, several other physicians had already discovered that it may be distinct from gout. The name "rheumatoid arthritis" itself was coined in 1859 by Alfred Baring Garrod. Landré-Beauvais' other preserved work, Séméiotique, ou traité des signes des maladies (initially published in 1809) concerns the physical signs of medical illnesses in general.
