= Reactive neutrophilic dermatoses =

- Specialty: Dermatology

Reactive neutrophilic dermatoses are a spectrum of conditions mediated by neutrophils, and typically associated with underlying diseases, such as inflammatory bowel disease and hematologic malignancy.

Conditions considered to be reactive neutrophilic dermatoses include:

- Erythema nodosum
- Marshall syndrome
- Sweet syndrome (Acute febrile neutrophilic dermatosis)
- Neutrophilic dermatosis of the dorsal hands (Pustular vasculitis of the dorsal hands)
- Neutrophilic eccrine hidradenitis
- Pyoderma gangrenosum
- PAPA syndrome
