= Clear cell acanthoma =

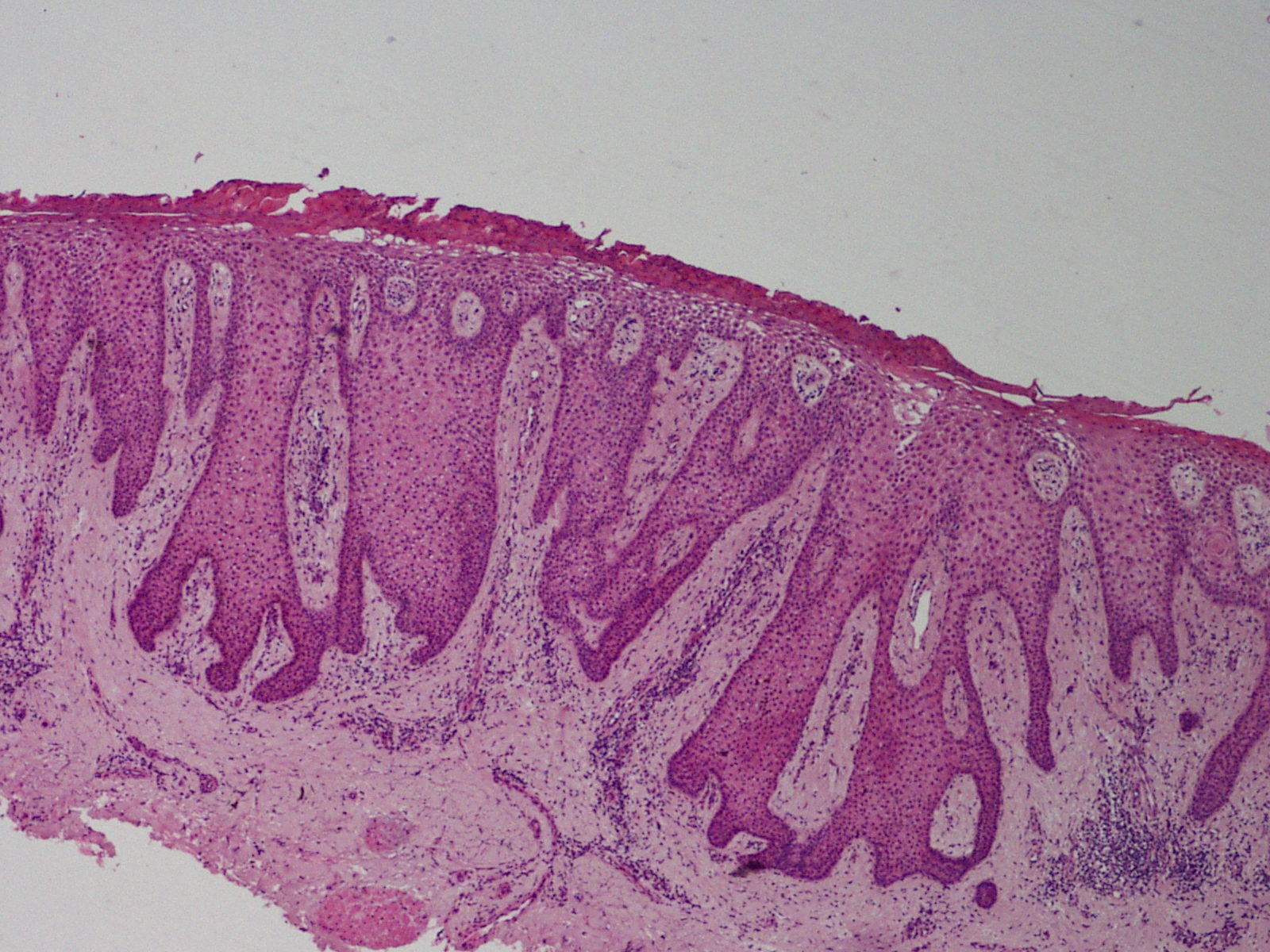
- Clear cell acanthoma (Degos)
- Specialty: Oncology

Clear cell acanthoma (also known as Acanthome cellules claires of Degos and Civatte, Degos acanthoma, and Pale cell acanthoma) is a benign clinical and histological lesion initially described as neoplastic, which some authors now regard as a reactive dermatosis. It usually presents as a moist solitary firm, brown-red, well-circumscribed, 5 mm to 2 cm nodule or plaque on the lower extremities of middle-aged to elderly individuals. The lesion has a crusted, scaly peripheral collarette and vascular puncta on the surface; in dermoscopy this looks like "a string of pearls". It is characterized by slow growth, and may persist for years. The clinical differential diagnosis includes: dermatofibroma, inflamed seborrheic keratosis, pyogenic granuloma, basal-cell carcinoma, squamous cell carcinoma, verruca vulgaris, psoriatic plaque, and melanoma.

== Histology ==
Clear cell acanthoma is characterized by a sharply demarcated psoriasiform epidermal hyperplasia composed of a proliferation of slightly enlarged keratinocytes, and basal cells with pale-staining glycogen-rich cytoplasm, mild spongiosis and scattered neutrophils, which may form small intraepidermal microabscesses. Oedematous dermal papillae are typically seen with increased vascularity and a mixed inflammatory infiltrate including lymphocytes, plasma cells and neutrophils.

== Treatment ==
Simple surgical excision is curative.

== See also ==
- Epidermis
- List of cutaneous conditions
- List of cutaneous neoplasms associated with systemic syndromes
