= Granulomatous facial dermatitis =

- Specialty: Dermatology

Granulomatous facial dermatitis is found in patients with persistent facial erythema involving one or more convex surfaces of the face, with lesions that show granulomatous reaction histologically.

== See also ==
- List of cutaneous conditions
