= Rheumatoid nodule =

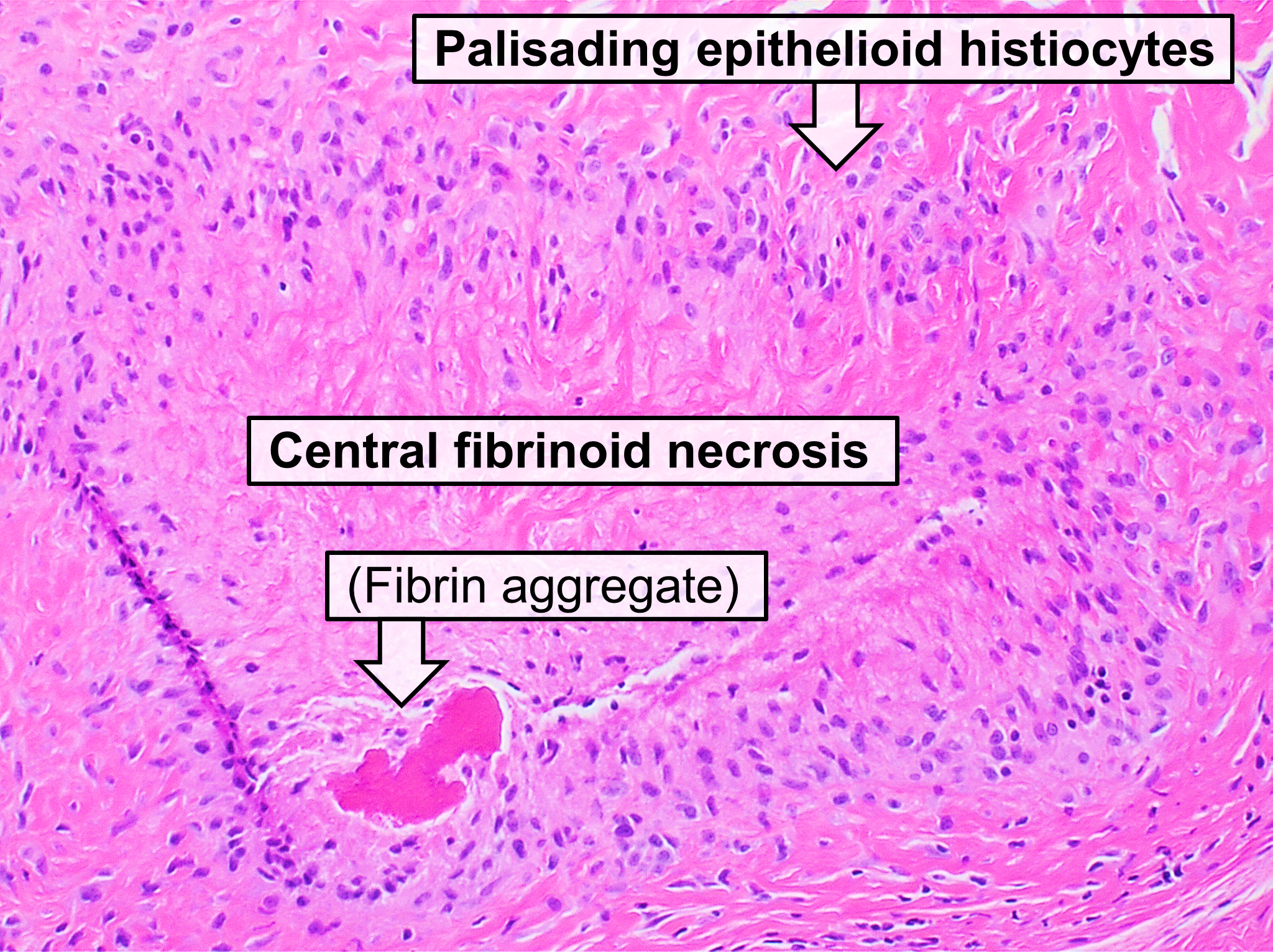
- Micrograph of a rheumatoid nodule, showing the characteristic palisading granuloma with a core consisting of necrotic collagen and fibrin. H&E stain.
- Specialty: Rheumatology

A rheumatoid nodule is a lump of tissue, or an area of swelling, that appears on the exterior of the skin usually around the olecranon (tip of the elbow) or the interphalangeal joints (finger knuckles), but can appear in other areas. There are four different types of rheumatoid nodules: subcutaneous rheumatoid nodules, cardiac nodules, pulmonary nodules, and central nervous systems nodules. These nodules occur almost exclusively in association with rheumatoid arthritis. Very rarely do rheumatoid nodules occur as rheumatoid nodulosis (multiple nodules on the hands or other areas) in the absence of rheumatoid arthritis. Rheumatoid nodules can also appear in areas of the body other than the skin. Less commonly they occur in the lining of the lungs or other internal organs. The occurrence of nodules in the lungs of miners exposed to silica dust was known as Caplan’s syndrome. Rarely, the nodules occur at diverse sites on body (e.g., upper eyelid, distal region of the soles of the feet, vulva, and internally in the gallbladder, lung, heart valves, larynx, and spine).

Rheumatoid nodules can vary in size from 2 mm to 5 cm and are usually rather firm to the touch. Quite often they are associated with synovial pockets or bursae. About 5% of people with rheumatoid arthritis have such nodules within two years of disease onset, and the cumulative prevalence is about 20–30%. Risk factors of developing rheumatoid nodules include as smoking and trauma to small vessels.

In the majority of the time, nodules are not painful or disabling in any way. They are usually more of an unsightly nuisance. However, rheumatoid nodules can become painful when infection or ulcers occur on the skin of the nodule. Some nodules may disappear over time, but other may grow larger, making nodular size difficult to predict.

Treatment of rheumatoid nodules can be quite difficult, but both surgical removal and injection of corticosteroids have shown good results.

== Pathophysiology ==
Although the exact process is unknown, there are a few hypotheses for the generation of rheumatoid nodules. It has been observed that rheumatoid nodules frequently form over extensor sites and areas vulnerable to trauma. The trauma causes inflammatory particles to build up and leads to a secondary inflammatory response which ultimately causes fibrin release and necrosis. Another hypothesis suggests that the inflammation of blood vessels activates complement components, which leads to the deposit of rheumatoid factors and fibrin.

The rheumatoid nodule is the most common cutaneous manifestation of rheumatoid arthritis. Rheumatoid arthritis involves chronic inflammation of synovial membranes, which leads to degradation of articular cartilage and the juxta-articular bone. Inflammation is caused by T cells, B cells, and monocytes when endothelial cells are activated. Neovascularization, the growth of new blood vessels, serves as an additional marker for rheumatoid arthritis. A hyperplastic synovial lining layer can be caused by the expansion of synovial fibroblast and macrophage cells. This expansion of the synovial membrane, sometimes referred to as "pannus", can lead to bony erosions and cartilage degradation at the site of the cartilage-bone junction in the periarticular bone.

The cause of rheumatoid arthritis is unknown. It is speculated that both genetic and environmental factors contribute to the development of rheumatoid arthritis. Gene loci and antigens, such as HLA class II antigens, have been seen as closely associated with rheumatoid arthritis. Environmental risk factors include smoking, periodontitis, viral infections, and gut, mouth, and lung microbiomes. Researchers have noted that Prevotella species, which are expanded in the gastrointestinal tract in early RA, and Porphyromonas gingivalis, which is associated with periodontitis, may have a role in pathogenesis.

== Pathology ==
Histological examination of nodules shows that they consist of a shell of fibrous tissue surrounding a center of fibrinoid necrosis. Pea-sized nodules have one center. Larger nodules tend to be multilocular, with many separate shells or with connections between the necrotic centers. Individual necrotic centers may contain a cleft or several centers of necrosis may all open on to a large bursal pocket containing synovial fluid.

The boundary between the necrotic center and the outer fibrous shell is made up of the characteristic feature of the nodule, which is known as a cellular palisade. The palisade is a densely packed layer of macrophages and fibroblasts which tend to be arranged radially, like the seeds of a kiwifruit or fig. Further out into the fibrous shell there is a zone that contains T cells and plasma cells in association with blood vessels. The histology of pulmonary nodules are similar to that of subcutaneous nodules, with central necrosis surrounded by palisading macrophages and inflammatory infiltrate.

== Risk factors ==
Rheumatoid nodules develop if a person currently has rheumatoid arthritis. However, not all people with rheumatoid arthritis develop rheumatoid nodules. Some risk factors for rheumatoid nodules for people with rheumatoid arthritis may include:

- Smoking (strong association)
- Elevated levels of serum rheumatoid factors
- HLA-DRB1 gene (weak association)
- Trauma to small vessels
- Having severe rheumatoid arthritis
- Taking Methotrexate over other arthritis drugs

== Diagnosis ==
Differential diagnosis of rheumatoid nodules can be classified from localization, depth pathology, age of onset, persistence, rheumatoid factor, concomitant joint disease, and bone erosions. Diagnosis is typically determined clinically by a rheumatologist. Rheumatoid arthritis associated rheumatoid nodules are typically subcutaneous and occur at extensor sites. The onset typically starts in adulthood and presents with rheumatoid factors and bone erosions, and concomitant joint diseases. The pathology is characterized by central necrosis, palisading mononuclear cells, and perivascular lymphocytic infiltrations.

Rheumatoid nodulosis is characterized by multiple subcutaneous nodules presenting with rheumatoid factors but an absence of joint complaints. The nodules are typically small and concentrated on the extensor sites of the hands and feet, sometimes accompanied by bone erosions. The onset typically starts in adulthood with a pathology similar to rheumatoid arthritis associated rheumatoid nodules.

Benign rheumatoid nodules are often not associated with rheumatoid factors or concomitant joint diseases. They are typically found on the feet, scalp, and pretibial regions. Frequently seen in children before the age of 18, the pathology is similar to that of rheumatoid arthritis associated rheumatoid nodules. The nodules are non-tender and undergo rapid growth, but also resolve spontaneously. A similar presentation occurring more intracutaneously (superficial) is known as granuloma annulare.

Rheumatic fever nodules are typically associated with acute rheumatic fever in children. They are not accompanied by rheumatoid factors or bone erosions, but are associated with concomitant joint diseases. No larger than the size of peas, they are typically found at extensor sites and processus spinosi of the vertebrae. The pathology is characterized by central necrosis and little histiocytic/lymphocytic infiltration.

== Prevalence ==
There are four different types of rheumatoid nodules: subcutaneous rheumatoid nodules, cardiac nodules, pulmonary nodules and central nervous system nodules.

Subcutaneous rheumatoid nodules

According to a study done by the BARFOT study group, 7% of individuals diagnosed with rheumatoid arthritis reported the presence of subcutaneous rheumatoid nodules upon initial diagnosis. And about 30–40% of all those diagnosed with rheumatoid arthritis reported developing these nodules throughout the course of the disease. Subcutaneous rheumatoid nodules is correlated with the increased risk of cardiovascular and respiratory disease, and those with detected subcutaneous rheumatoid nodules should be assessed for cardiovascular and respiratory risk factors.

Cardiac nodules

Rheumatoid nodules may also form in the heart. Specifically, it could develop in the myocardium, pericardium, and other valvular structures, and these nodules can be discovered through echocardiograms. There are little studies with minimal data on the development of cardiac nodules in association with rheumatoid arthritis, but the general consensus is that such occurrences is relatively rare.

Pulmonary Nodules

The reported prevalence of pulmonary nodules has varying depending on the method of detection. In a 1984 study done on lung biopsies in rheumatoid arthritis, the reported prevalence was about 32% in a sample size of 40 individuals. However, another clinical study utilizing a different method of detection; plain film radiographs of the chest; showed that only 2 out of 516 people (~0.4%) diagnosed with rheumatoid arthritis developed pulmonary nodules. Additionally, other clinical studies have reported increased pulmonary nodule growth following treatments with methotrexate, leflunomide, and etanercept.

Central nervous system nodules

Like cardiac nodules, nodules developing in the central nervous system is also relatively rare. Most reports of nodule growth on the central nervous system also presented with severe stages of erosive joint diseases. Generally, these nodules can be detected through MRI and confirmed through biopsies. As of right now, there are no known mediations that have been reported in reducing nodules in the central nervous systems.

== Prevention ==
There are no methods as of right now to completely prevent the development of rheumatoid nodules, but for those diagnosed with rheumatoid arthritis, proper management of the disease could reduce the risk of nodule formation. Additionally, proper medication adherence, smoking cessation, increasing physical activity, and keeping up with doctor appointments are just some lifestyle changes that could "prevent" nodules.

== Treatment ==
Treatment for rheumatoid nodules may be tricky as some treatments for rheumatoid arthritis can act against the nodules. Common drug therapies for rheumatoid arthritis may show no benefits towards the treatment for rheumatoid nodules. Common drug therapies, such as anti TNF treatment or other immunosuppressive drugs, for rheumatoid arthritis has shown little effect on the nodules. In fact, it has been shown that Methotrexate, a drug often used in rheumatoid arthritis, is actually correlated with the increased risk of nodule formation. Because rheumatoid nodules also cause pain or nerve entrapment, treatment for these symptoms with nonsteroidal anti-inflammatory drugs may be sufficient. Other drug therapies, such as corticosteroids, have shown to decrease nodular size, however, it can increase the risk of infection as well. Local corticosteroid injections seems to be the most studied treatment for rheumatoid nodules as of now.

Surgery to have the nodule removed is another option that can be done to treat rheumatoid nodules. However, usually these are usually only indicated in the case of eroding/ necrotising skin.

== See also ==
- Rheumatoid nodulosis
- Rheumatoid arthritis
