= Neutrophilic eccrine hidradenitis =

- Specialty: Dermatology

Neutrophilic eccrine hidradenitis (NEH) usually is a cutaneous complication of chemotherapy, but it can also occur for other reasons. It consists of fever and non specific skin lesions. It is rare, and self-limited.

== Signs and symptoms ==
Fever and a non specific skin eruption – with reddening (erythema) and swelling (oedema) of the skin – are the most common symptoms of NEH. Patients usually present with the skin eruption 1-2 weeks after use of the cytotoxic drug. Sometimes, the skin eruption can be painful. Skin eruptions can be located on the extremities, trunk, and face. Severe lesions are rare, and can mimic cellulitis. Generalised lesions resembling erythema multiforme have been reported.

== Cause ==
The overwhelming majority of neutrophilic eccrine hidradenitis (NEH) is seen in people with cancer, especially leukaemia, who receive chemotherapy with a cytotoxic drug. These include: Bleomycin, chlorambucil, cyclophosphamide, cytarabine, doxorubicin, lomustine, mitoxantrone, topotecan, and vincristine.

NEH was first described in 1982 in a patient with acute myeloid leukaemia (AML) who had received cytarabine as chemotherapy.

Cancer itself, infections, and other medicinal drugs also can lead to NEH. NEH has been reported in patients with cancer who have not received any form of chemotherapy (i.e., as a paraneoplastic syndrome), in patients with HIV and/or AIDS, and after the use of paracetamol (acetaminophen). Also the use of targeted agents can lead to NEH, e.g. imatinib, a tyrosine kinase inhibitor.

NEH has also been described without any known reason (idiopathic cases), including idiopathic cases in children.

The exact cause of NEH is unknown. In patients receiving chemotherapy, it has been postulated that a high concentration of the cytotoxic drug in sweat has a direct toxic effect on the eccrine glands.

== Diagnosis ==
In all cases of suspected NEH, a skin biopsy should be performed, because the clinical symptoms are non specific, but the histopathological findings on the biopsy are specific. The biopsy shows characteristic changes of the eccrine glands, the major sweat glands of the body.

In NEH, eccrine gland necrosis, and neutrophils surroundings the eccrine glands, are typical findings on biopsy. If the chemotherapy has recently been administered, chemotherapy induced neutropenia may be present, and, as a result, the neutrophils may be absent. But the other characteristic finding, i.e. eccrine gland necrosis, can still be seen. A vacuolar interface dermatitis also is visible in glands and ducts, along with necrosis of the lining cells.

In addition, in patients receiving chemotherapy, keratinocyte atypia can be seen.

== Prevention ==
A single case report suggested that oral dapsone may be useful for prevention. However, the efficacy of oral dapsone as prevention has not been demonstrated very clearly until now.

== Treatment ==
NEH is self-limited and usually resolves without treatment. In the overwhelming majority of the cases, spontaneous resolution occurs within 1–2 weeks.

However, if the patient developed NEH after chemotherapy, the offending cytotoxic drug has to be discontinued, and the patient must avoid this particular cytotoxic drug in the future, because NEH usually re occurs upon re exposure to the same cytotoxic drug.

Despite the fact that NEH is self limited and usually resolves without treatment, some researchers use treatment, mainly systemic corticosteroids, although the efficacy of such a therapy has not been demonstrated in a large randomised controlled clinical trial until now.

== See also ==
- Skin lesion
- List of cutaneous conditions
