= Sweet's syndrome-like dermatosis =

Cutaneous condition associated with bowel disorders

- Specialty: Dermatology

Sweet's syndrome-like dermatosis is a cutaneous condition associated with bowel disorders.

== See also ==
- Sweet's syndrome
- List of cutaneous conditions
