= Rheumatoid arthritis =

Type of autoimmune arthritis

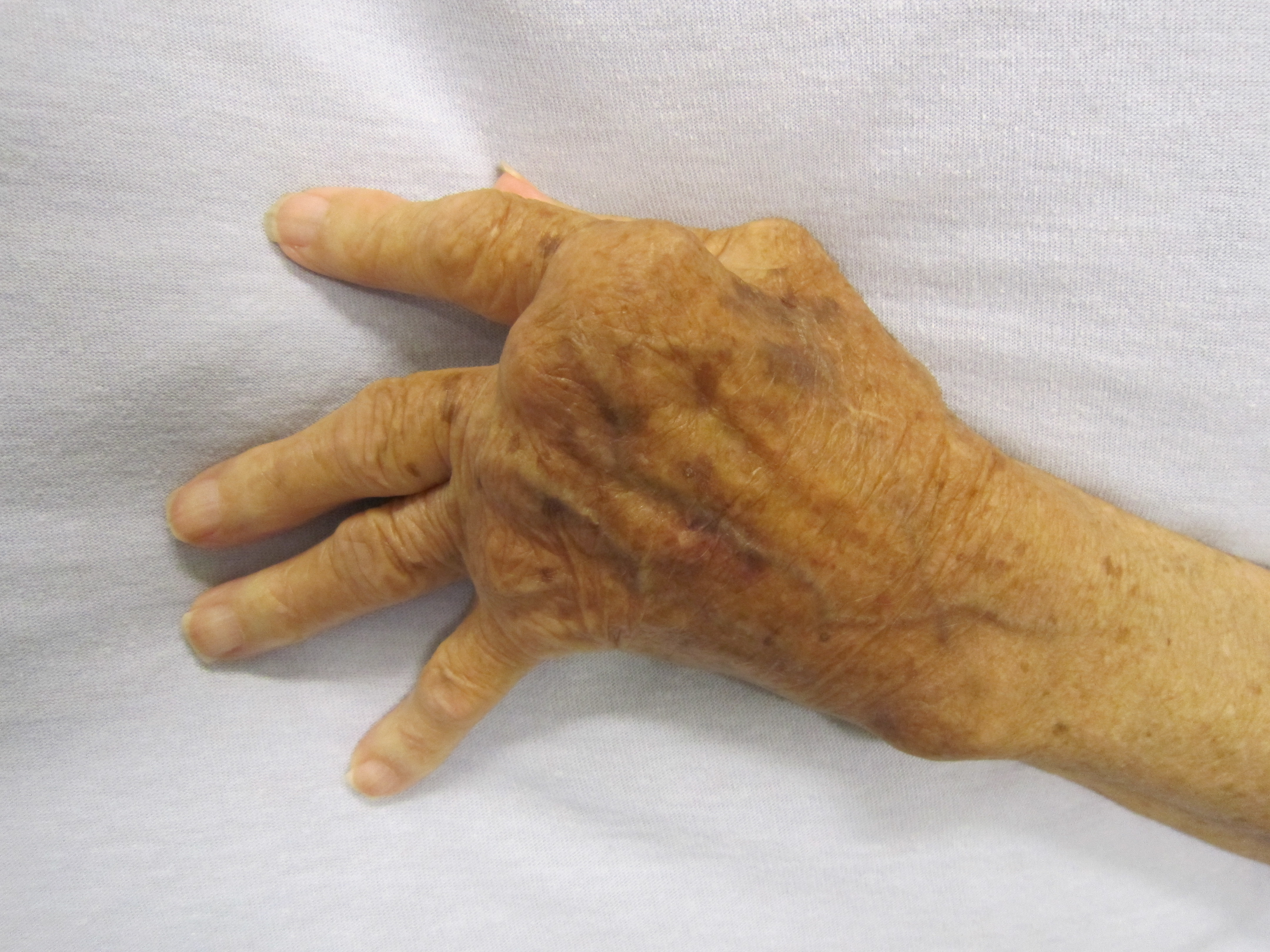
- A hand severely affected by rheumatoid arthritis. This degree of swelling and deformation does not typically occur with current treatment.
- Specialty: Rheumatology, Immunology
- Symptoms: Warm, swollen, painful joints
- Complications: Low red blood cells, inflammation around the lungs, inflammation around the heart
- Usual onset: Middle age
- Duration: Lifelong
- Causes: Unknown
- Diagnostic method: Based on symptoms, medical imaging, blood tests
- Differential diagnosis: Systemic lupus erythematosus, psoriatic arthritis, fibromyalgia
- Medication: Pain medications, steroids, nonsteroidal anti-inflammatory drugs, disease-modifying antirheumatic drugs
- Frequency: 0.5–1% (adults in developed world)
- Deaths: 38,300 (2020)

Rheumatoid arthritis (RA) is a long-term autoimmune disorder that primarily affects joints. It typically results in warm, swollen, and painful joints. Pain and stiffness often worsen following rest. Most commonly, the wrist and hands are involved, with the same joints typically involved on both sides of the body. The disease may also affect other parts of the body, including skin, eyes, lungs, heart, nerves, and blood. This may result in a low red blood cell count, inflammation around the lungs, fever, low energy and inflammation around the heart. Often, symptoms come on gradually over weeks to months. It is divided into three phases : a phase of disease risk, an asymptomatic autoimmunity phase where individuals carry autoantibodies for post-translationally modified proteins and the symptomatic phase, where individuals develop synovitis (acute joint inflammation).

The cause of rheumatoid arthritis is believed to involve a combination of genetic and environmental factors. The underlying mechanism involves the body's immune system attacking the joints. This results in inflammation and thickening of the joint capsule. It also affects the underlying bone and cartilage. The diagnosis is based on a person's signs and symptoms. X-rays and laboratory testing may support a diagnosis or exclude other diseases with similar symptoms. Other diseases that may present similarly include systemic lupus erythematosus, psoriatic arthritis, and fibromyalgia.

The goals of treatment are to reduce pain, decrease inflammation, and improve a person's overall functioning. This may be helped by balancing rest and exercise, the use of splints and braces, or the use of assistive devices. Pain medications, steroids, and NSAIDs are frequently used to help with symptoms. Disease-modifying antirheumatic drugs (DMARDs), such as hydroxychloroquine and methotrexate, may be used to try to slow the progression of disease. Biological DMARDs may be used when the disease does not respond to other treatments. However, they may have a greater rate of adverse effects. Surgery to repair, replace, or fuse joints may help in certain situations.

Rheumatoid arthritis affects about 17.6 million people globally, as of 2020. This is 0.5–1% of adults in the developed world with between 5 and 50 per 100,000 people newly developing the condition each year. Onset is most frequent during middle age and women are affected 2.5 times more than men. It resulted in 38,300 deaths in 2020, up from 28,000 deaths in 1990. The first recognized description of RA was made in 1800 by Dr. Augustin Jacob Landré-Beauvais (1772–1840) of Paris. The term rheumatoid arthritis is based on the Greek words for watery and inflamed joints (from Ancient Greek ῥεῦμα (rheûma) 'flowing current', with arthritis derived from arthr- (meaning 'joint') and -itis (meaning 'inflammation')).

== Signs and symptoms ==
Rheumatoid arthritis (RA) is a chronic autoimmune disorder that can affect multiple organ systems. It mainly affects fluid filled connections between joints (synovial joints), causing inflammation, pain, and stiffness in the joints. RA also affects other organs in 20–40% of people. RA typically develops slowly and affects both sides of the body. Systemic symptoms such as fatigue, low-grade fevers and weight loss are also seen in RA.

=== Joints ===
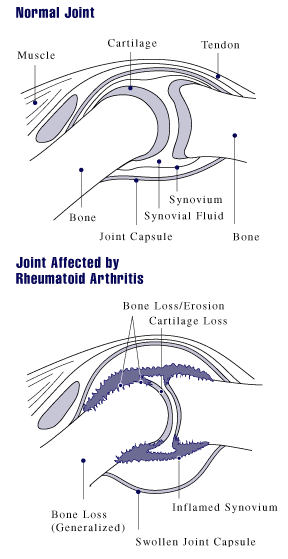
A diagram showing how rheumatoid arthritis affects a joint

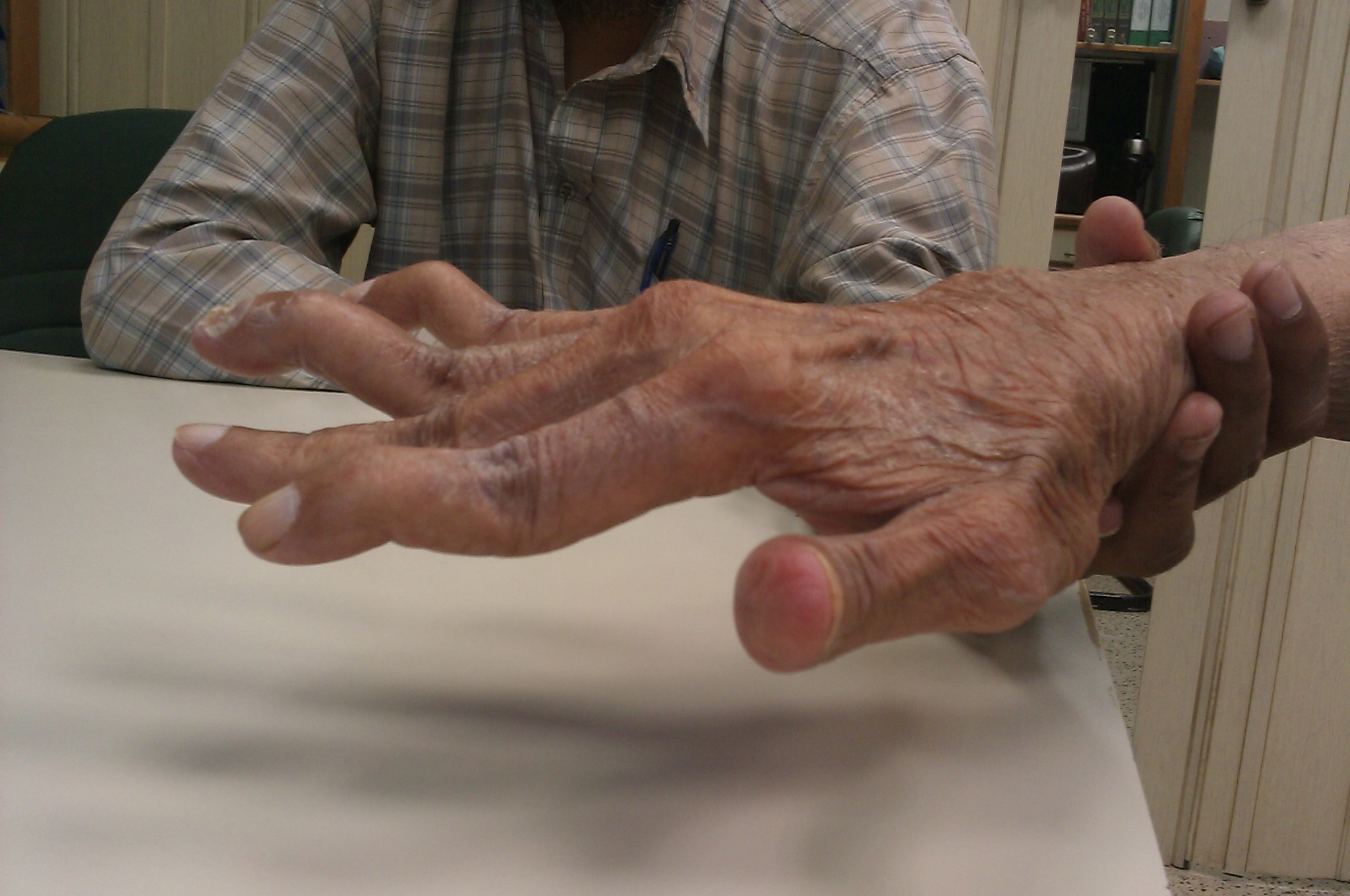
Hand deformity, sometimes called a swan deformity, in an elderly person with rheumatoid arthritis

The main symptoms of RA are joint pain, swelling, and stiffness, which are usually worst in the morning or after resting. Joint affected by RA are often tender when pressed or moved. Morning stiffness can last for several hours but gradually improves with movement and physical activity.This is different from osteoarthritis, where stiffness doesn't last as long. The symptoms of RA can make it difficult to perform everyday tasks, interfere with sleep, and reduce overall quality of life.

RA usually develops gradually and often begins by affecting the small joints of the hands (metacarpophalangeal and proximal interphalangeal joints) and feet before spreading to larger joints. The condition can affect any joint, tendon, or bursa that contains synovial tissue, including the elbows, shoulders, ankles, knees, hips, and jaw. RA is polyarticular, meaning it affects multiple joints. Although RA usually affects the same joints on both sides of the body, this symmetry may not be present in the early stages. RA can be difficult to detect when it first develops because inflammation of the synovial membrane (synovitis) may not be visible early on. Signs of synovitis include soft, spongy swelling around a joint. Joint deformities are not seen early in the disease but can develop over time if RA is severe, chronic, or left untreated, and can potentially lead to significant disability.

As the pathology progresses, the inflammatory activity leads to tendon tethering and erosion and destruction of the joint surface, which impairs range of movement and leads to deformity. The fingers may develop almost any deformity depending on which joints are most involved. Specific deformities, which also occur in osteoarthritis, include ulnar deviation, boutonniere deformity (also "buttonhole deformity", flexion of proximal interphalangeal joint and extension of distal interphalangeal joint of the hand), swan neck deformity (hyperextension at proximal interphalangeal joint and flexion at distal interphalangeal joint) and "Z-thumb". "Z-thumb" or "Z-deformity" consists of hyperextension of the interphalangeal joint, fixed flexion, and subluxation of the metacarpophalangeal joint and gives a "Z" appearance to the thumb. The hammer toe deformity may be seen. In the worst case, joints are known as arthritis mutilans due to the mutilating nature of the deformities.

=== Skin ===
The rheumatoid nodule, which is sometimes in the skin, is the most common non-joint feature and occurs in 30% of people who have RA. It is a type of inflammatory reaction known as a "necrotizing granuloma". The initial pathologic process in nodule formation is unknown but may be essentially the same as the synovitis, since similar structural features occur in both. The nodule has a central area of fibrinoid necrosis that may be fissured and which corresponds to the fibrin-rich necrotic material found in and around an affected synovial space. Surrounding the necrosis is a layer of palisading macrophages and fibroblasts, corresponding to the intimal layer in synovium and a cuff of connective tissue containing clusters of lymphocytes and plasma cells, corresponding to the subintimal zone in synovitis. The typical rheumatoid nodule may be a few millimetres to a few centimetres in diameter and is usually found over bony prominences, such as the elbow, the heel, the knuckles, or other areas that sustain repeated mechanical stress. Nodules are associated with a positive RF (rheumatoid factor) titer, ACPA, and severe erosive arthritis. Rarely, these can occur in internal organs or at diverse sites on the body.

Several forms of vasculitis occur in RA, but are mostly seen with long-standing and untreated disease. The most common presentation is due to involvement of small- and medium-sized vessels. Rheumatoid vasculitis can thus commonly present with skin ulceration and vasculitic nerve infarction known as mononeuritis multiplex.

Other, rather rare, skin associated symptoms include pyoderma gangrenosum, Sweet's syndrome, drug reactions, erythema nodosum, lobe panniculitis, atrophy of finger skin, palmar erythema, and skin fragility (often worsened by corticosteroid use).

Diffuse alopecia areata (Diffuse AA) occurs more commonly in people with rheumatoid arthritis. RA is also seen more often in those with relatives who have AA.

=== Lungs ===
Lung fibrosis is a recognized complication of rheumatoid arthritis. It is also a rare but well-recognized consequence of medications used to treat RA such as methotrexate and leflunomide). Caplan's syndrome describes lung nodules in individuals with RA and additional exposure to coal dust. Exudative pleural effusions are also associated with RA.

=== Heart and blood vessels ===
People with RA are more prone to atherosclerosis, and risk of myocardial infarction (heart attack) and stroke is markedly increased. Other possible complications that may arise include: pericarditis, endocarditis, left ventricular failure, valvulitis and fibrosis. Many people with RA do not experience the same chest pain that others feel when they have angina or myocardial infarction. To reduce cardiovascular risk, it is crucial to maintain optimal control of the inflammation caused by RA (which may be involved in causing the cardiovascular risk), and to use exercise and medications appropriately to reduce other cardiovascular risk factors such as blood lipids and blood pressure. Doctors who treat people with RA should be sensitive to cardiovascular risk when prescribing anti-inflammatory medications, and may want to consider prescribing routine use of low doses of aspirin if the gastrointestinal effects are tolerable.

=== Blood ===
Various mechanisms can cause anemia in rheumatoid arthritis, which is by far the most common abnormality of the blood cells. The chronic inflammation caused by RA leads to raised hepcidin levels, leading to anemia of chronic disease where iron is poorly absorbed and also sequestered into macrophages. The red cells are of normal size and color (normocytic and Normochromic).

A low white blood cell count usually only occurs in people with Felty's syndrome with an enlarged liver and spleen. The mechanism of neutropenia is complex. An increased platelet count occurs when inflammation is uncontrolled.

=== Other ===
The role of the circadian clock in rheumatoid arthritis suggests a correlation between an early morning rise in circulating levels of pro-inflammatory cytokines, such as interleukin-6 and painful morning joint stiffness.

==== Kidneys ====
Renal amyloidosis can occur as a consequence of untreated chronic inflammation. Treatment with penicillamine or gold salts such as sodium aurothiomalate are recognized causes of membranous nephropathy.

==== Eyes ====
The eye can be directly affected in the form of episcleritis or scleritis, which, when severe, can very rarely progress to perforating scleromalacia. Rather more common is the indirect effect of keratoconjunctivitis sicca, which is a dryness of eyes and mouth caused by lymphocyte infiltration of lacrimal and salivary glands. When severe, dryness of the cornea can lead to keratitis and loss of vision, as well as being painful. Preventive treatment of severe dryness with measures such as nasolacrimal duct blockage is important.

==== Liver ====
Liver problems in people with rheumatoid arthritis may be from the underlying disease process or the medications used to treat the disease. A coexisting autoimmune liver disease, such as primary biliary cirrhosis or autoimmune hepatitis may also cause problems.

==== Neurological ====
Peripheral neuropathy and mononeuritis multiplex may occur. The most common problem is carpal tunnel syndrome caused by compression of the median nerve by swelling around the wrist.

Rheumatoid disease of the spine can lead to myelopathy. Atlanto-axial subluxation can occur, owing to erosion of the odontoid process or transverse ligaments in the cervical spine connection to the skull. Such an erosion (>3mm) can give rise to vertebrae slipping over one another and compressing the spinal cord. Clumsiness is initially experienced, but without due care, this can progress to quadriplegia or even death.Vertigo may be associated with rheumatoid arthritis via the following associations that can cause vertigo:

- Ménière's disease
- "Biologic disease-modifying antirheumatic drugs" This may not happen in the absence of infection.
- Atlanto-axial joint instability can cause symptoms including vertigo and sudden death.
- Atypical Cogan's syndrome may be associated with rheumoatoid arthritis.

==== Bones ====
Local osteoporosis occurs in RA around the inflamed joints. It is postulated to be partially caused by inflammatory cytokines. More general osteoporosis is probably contributed to by immobility, systemic cytokine effects, local cytokine release in bone marrow, and corticosteroid therapy.

==== Cancer ====
The incidence of lymphoma is increased, although it is uncommon and associated with the chronic inflammation, not the treatment of RA. The risk of non-melanoma skin cancer is increased in people with RA compared to the general population, an association possibly due to the use of immunosuppression agents for treating RA.

==== Teeth ====
Periodontitis and tooth loss are common in people with rheumatoid arthritis.

== Risk factors ==
RA is a systemic (whole body) autoimmune disease. Certain genetic and environmental factors affect the risk of RA.

=== Genetic ===
Worldwide, RA affects approximately 1% of the adult population and occurs in one in 1,000 children. Studies show that RA primarily affects individuals between the ages of 40–60 years and is seen more commonly in females. A family history of RA increases the risk around three to five times; as of 2016, it was estimated that genetics may account for 40–65% of cases of seropositive RA, but only around 20% for seronegative RA. RA is strongly associated with genes of the inherited tissue type major histocompatibility complex (MHC) antigen. HLA-DR4 is the major genetic factor implicated – the relative importance varies across ethnic groups.

Genome-wide association studies examining single-nucleotide polymorphisms have found around one hundred alleles associated with RA risk. Risk alleles within the HLA (particularly HLA-DRB1) genes harbor more risk than other loci. The HLA encodes proteins that control recognition of self- versus non-self molecules. Other risk loci include genes affecting co-stimulatory immune pathways—for example CD28 and CD40, cytokine signaling, lymphocyte receptor activation threshold (e.g., PTPN22), and innate immune activation—appear to have less influence than HLA mutations.

Despite the strong genetic components of the disease, identical twin studies have shown only 12–15% concordance for twins raised in separate households. This suggests that rheumatoid arthritis most likely results from a combination of genetic and environmental factors in the majority of cases.

=== Environmental ===
There are established epigenetic and environmental risk factors for RA. Smoking is an established risk factor for RA in Caucasian populations, increasing the risk three times compared to non-smokers, particularly in men, heavy smokers, and those who are rheumatoid factor positive. Modest alcohol consumption may be protective.

Silica exposure has been linked to RA.

Preliminary research is investigating whether the incidence of inflammatory arthritis, including RA, may be increased following COVID-19.

=== Negative findings ===
No infectious agent has been consistently linked with RA and there is no evidence of disease clustering to indicate its infectious cause, but periodontal disease has been consistently associated with RA.

The many negative findings suggest that either the trigger varies or that it might be a chance event inherent in the immune response.

== Pathophysiology ==
RA primarily starts as a state of persistent cellular activation leading to autoimmunity and immune complexes in joints and other organs where it manifests.

The clinical manifestations of disease are primarily inflammation of the synovial membrane and joint damage, and the fibroblast-like synoviocytes play a key role in these pathogenic processes. Three phases of progression of RA are an initiation phase (due to non-specific inflammation), an amplification phase (due to T cell activation), and chronic inflammatory phase, with tissue injury resulting from the cytokines, IL–1, TNF-alpha, and IL–6.

=== Non-specific inflammation ===
Factors allowing an abnormal immune response, once initiated, become permanent and chronic. These factors are genetic disorders which change regulation of the adaptive immune response. Genetic factors interact with environmental risk factors for RA, with cigarette smoking as the most clearly defined risk factor.

Other environmental and hormonal factors may explain higher risks for women, including onset after childbirth and hormonal medications. A possibility for increased susceptibility is that negative feedback mechanisms – which normally maintain tolerance – are overtaken by positive feedback mechanisms for certain antigens, such as IgG Fc bound by rheumatoid factor and citrullinated fibrinogen bound by antibodies to citrullinated peptides (ACPA – Anti–citrullinated protein antibody). A debate on the relative roles of B-cell produced immune complexes and T cell products in inflammation in RA has continued for 30 years, but neither cell is necessary at the site of inflammation, only autoantibodies to IgGFc, known as rheumatoid factors and ACPA, with ACPA having an 80% specificity for diagnosing RA. As with other autoimmune diseases, people with RA have abnormally glycosylated antibodies, which are believed to promote joint inflammation.

=== Amplification in the synovium ===
Once the generalized abnormal immune response has become established, which may take several years before any symptoms occur, plasma cells derived from B lymphocytes produce rheumatoid factors and ACPA of the IgG and IgM classes in large quantities. These activate macrophages through Fc receptor and complement binding, which is part of the intense inflammation in RA. Binding of an autoreactive antibody to the Fc receptors is mediated through the antibody's N-glycans, which are altered to promote inflammation in people with RA.

This contributes to local inflammation in a joint, specifically the synovium, with edema, vasodilation and entry of activated T-cells, mainly CD4 in microscopically nodular aggregates and CD8 in microscopically diffuse infiltrates.

Synovial macrophages and dendritic cells function as antigen-presenting cells by expressing MHC class II molecules, which establishes the immune reaction in the tissue.

=== Chronic inflammation ===
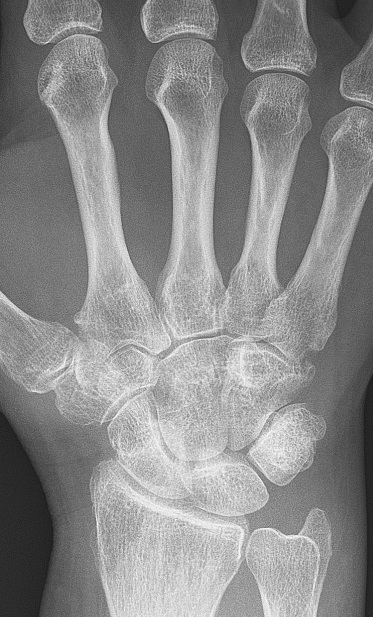
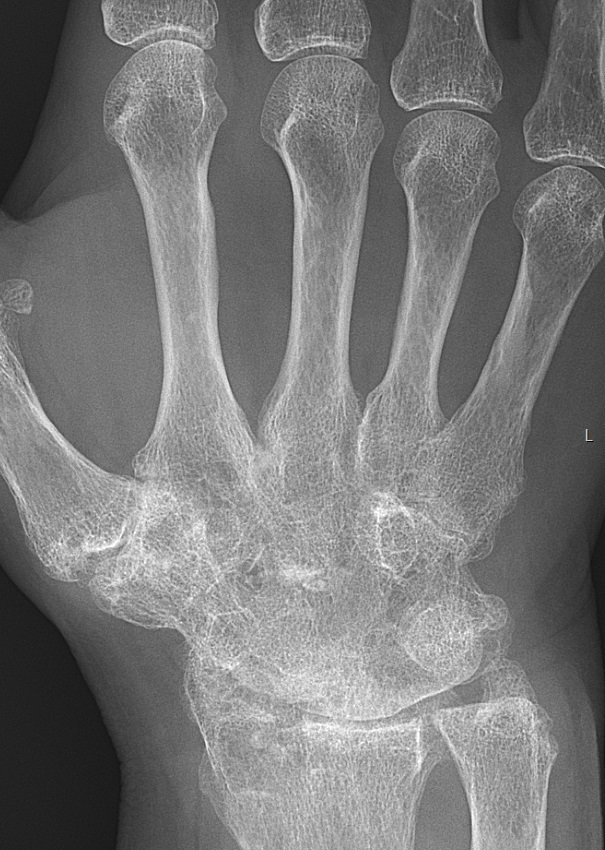
X-ray of the wrist of a woman with rheumatoid arthritis, showing unaffected carpal bones in the left image, and ankylosing fusion of the carpal bones eight years later in the right image

The disease progresses by forming granulation tissue at the edges of the synovial lining, pannus with extensive angiogenesis and enzymes causing tissue damage. The fibroblast-like synoviocytes have a prominent role in these pathogenic processes. The synovium thickens, cartilage and underlying bone disintegrate, and the joint deteriorates, with raised calprotectin levels serving as a biomarker of these events.

Cytokines and chemokines attract and accumulate immune cells, i.e., activated T- and B cells, monocytes, and macrophages from activated fibroblast-like synoviocytes, in the joint space. By signalling through RANKL and RANK, they eventually trigger osteoclast production, which degrades bone tissue. The fibroblast-like synoviocytes that are present in the synovium during rheumatoid arthritis display altered phenotype compared to the cells present in normal tissues. The aggressive phenotype of fibroblast-like synoviocytes in rheumatoid arthritis and the effect these cells have on the microenvironment of the joint can be summarized into hallmarks that distinguish them from healthy fibroblast-like synoviocytes. These hallmark features of fibroblast-like synoviocytes in rheumatoid arthritis are divided into seven cell-intrinsic hallmarks and four cell-extrinsic hallmarks. The cell-intrinsic hallmarks are: reduced apoptosis, impaired contact inhibition, increased migratory invasive potential, changed epigenetic landscape, temporal and spatial heterogeneity, genomic instability and mutations, and reprogrammed cellular metabolism. The cell-extrinsic hallmarks of FLS in RA are: promotes osteoclastogenesis and bone erosion, contributes to cartilage degradation, induces synovial angiogenesis, and recruits and stimulates immune cells.

== Diagnosis ==
=== Imaging ===
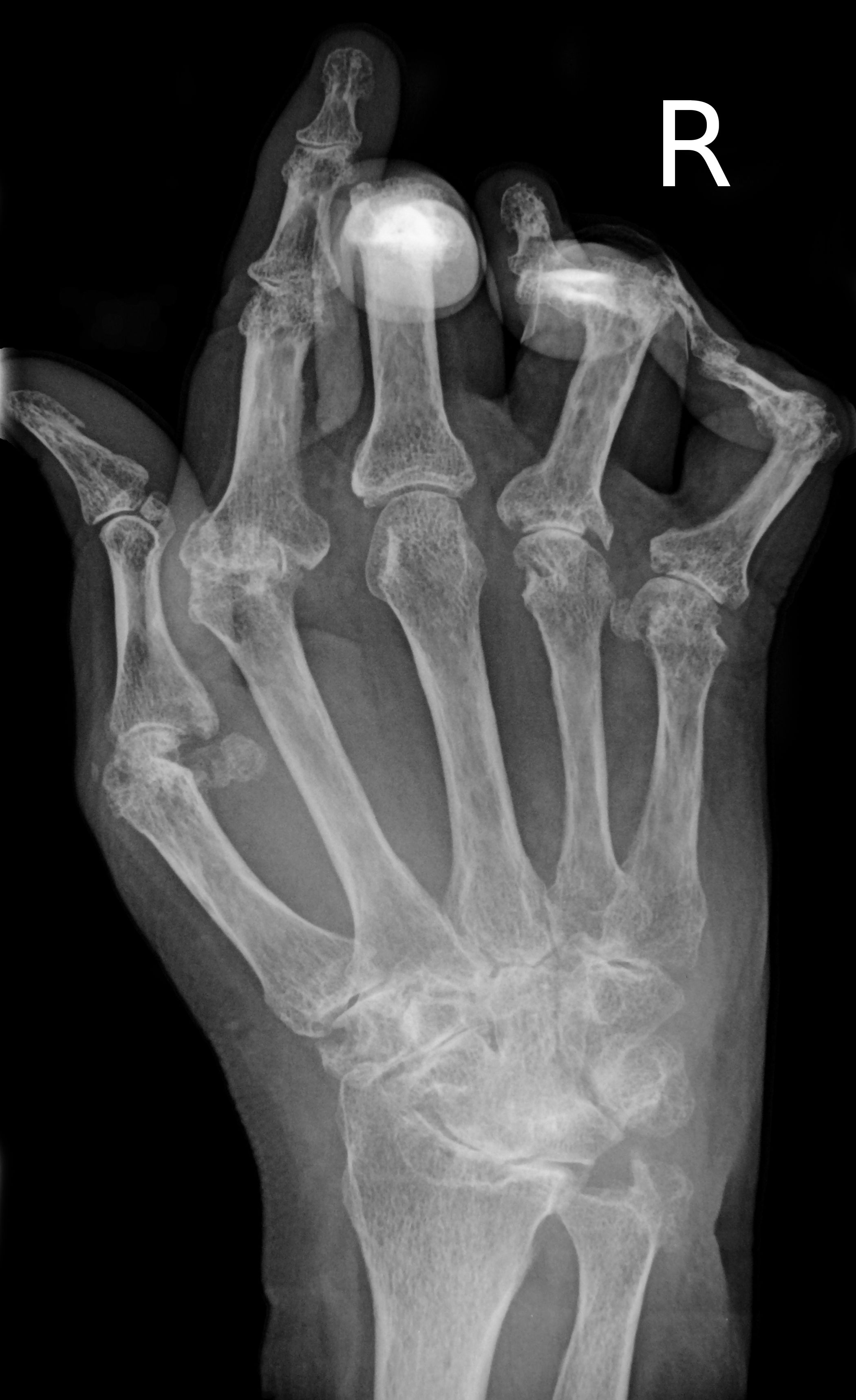
X-ray of the hand in rheumatoid arthritis

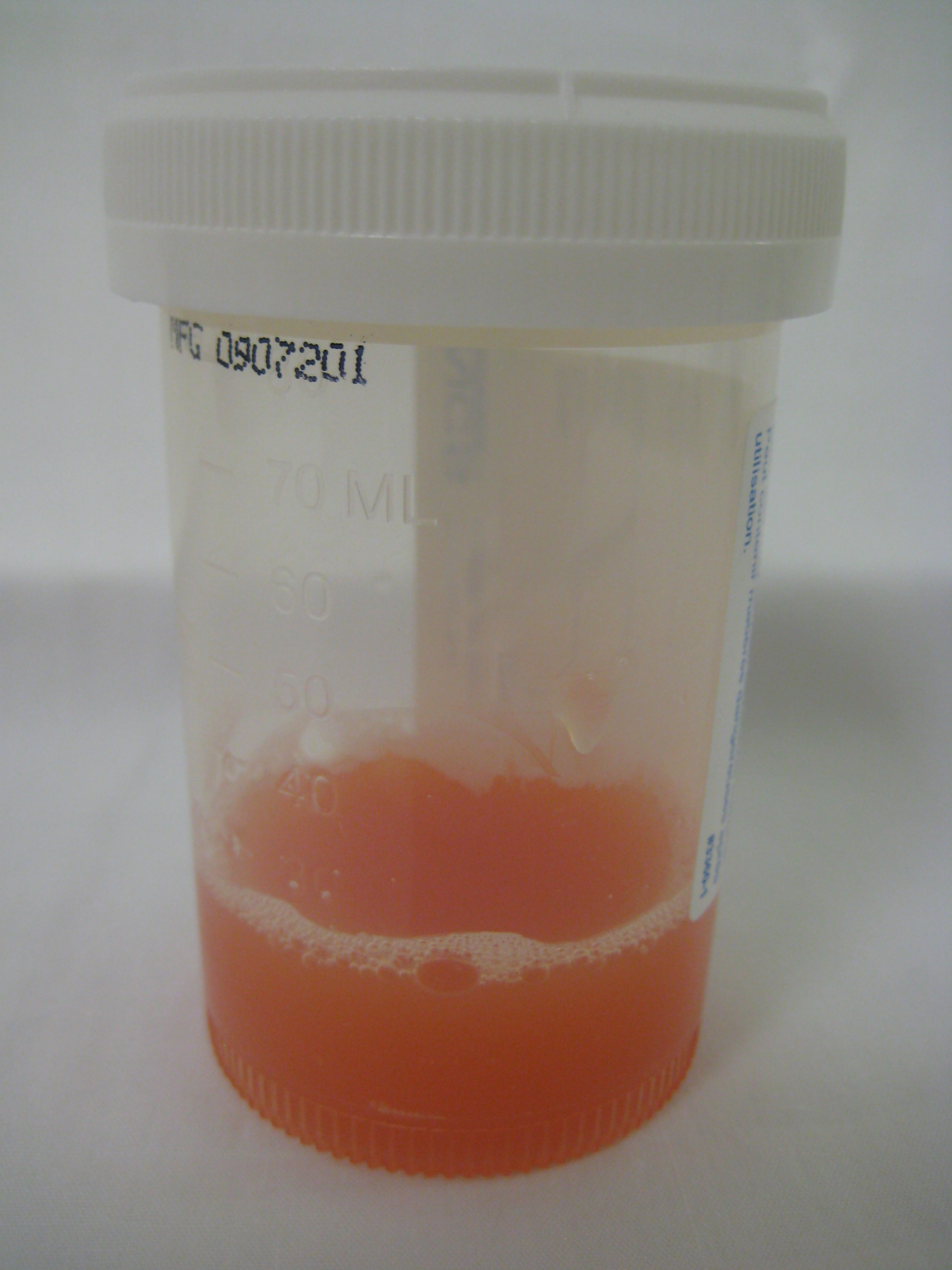
Appearance of synovial fluid from a joint with inflammatory arthritis

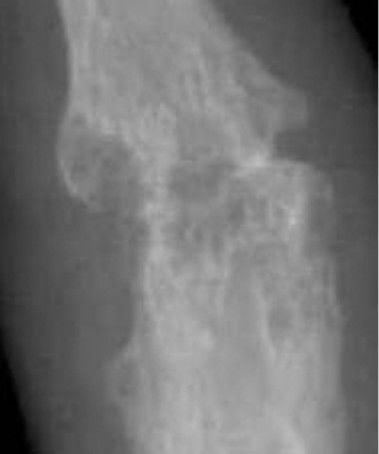
Closeup of bone erosions in rheumatoid arthritis

X-rays of the hands and feet are generally performed when many joints are affected. In RA, there may be no changes in the early stages of the disease, or the X-ray may show osteopenia near the joint, soft tissue swelling, and a smaller than normal joint space. As the disease advances, there may be bony erosions and subluxation. Other medical imaging techniques such as magnetic resonance imaging (MRI) and ultrasound are also used in RA.

Technical advances in ultrasonography, like high-frequency transducers (10 MHz or higher), have improved the spatial resolution of ultrasound images, depicting 20% more erosions than conventional radiography. Color Doppler and power Doppler ultrasound are useful in assessing the degree of synovial inflammation as they can show vascular signals of active synovitis. This is important since in the early stages of RA, the synovium is primarily affected, and synovitis seems to be the best predictive marker of future joint damage.

=== Blood tests ===
When RA is clinically suspected, a physician may test for rheumatoid factor (RF) and anti-citrullinated protein antibodies (ACPAs measured as anti-CCP antibodies). The test is positive approximately two-thirds of the time, but a negative RF or CCP antibody does not rule out RA; rather, the arthritis is called seronegative, which occurs in approximately a third of people with RA. During the first year of illness, rheumatoid factor is more likely to be negative with some individuals becoming seropositive over time. RF is a non-specific antibody and seen in about 10% of healthy people, in many other chronic infections like hepatitis C, and chronic autoimmune diseases such as Sjögren's disease and systemic lupus erythematosus. Therefore, the test is not specific for RA.

Hence, new serological tests check for anti-citrullinated protein antibodies ACPAs. These tests are again positive in 61–75% of all RA cases, but with a specificity of around 95%. As with RF, ACPAs are many times present before symptoms have started.

The by far most common clinical test for ACPAs is the anti-cyclic citrullinated peptide (anti CCP) ELISA. In 2008, a serological point-of-care test for the early detection of RA combined the detection of RF and anti-MCV with a sensitivity of 72% and specificity of 99.7%.

To improve the diagnostic capture rate in the early detection of patients with RA and to risk-stratify these individuals, the rheumatology field continues to seek complementary markers to both RF and anti-CCP. 14-3-3η (YWHAH) is one such marker that complements RF and anti-CCP, along with other serological measures like C-reactive protein. In a systematic review, 14-3-3η has been described as a welcome addition to the rheumatology field. The authors indicate that the serum-based 14-3-η marker is additive to the armamentarium of existing tools available to clinicians, and that there is adequate clinical evidence to support its clinical benefits.

Other blood tests are usually done to differentiate from other causes of arthritis, like the erythrocyte sedimentation rate (ESR), C-reactive protein, full blood count, kidney function, liver enzymes and other immunological tests (e.g., antinuclear antibody/ANA) are all performed at this stage. Elevated ferritin levels can reveal hemochromatosis, a mimic of RA, or be a sign of Still's disease, a seronegative, usually juvenile, variant of rheumatoid Arthritis.

=== Classification criteria ===
In 2010, the 2010 ACR / EULAR Rheumatoid Arthritis Classification Criteria were introduced.

The new criteria are not diagnostic criteria, but are classification criteria to identify disease with a high likelihood of developing a chronic form. However a score of 6 or greater unequivocally classifies a person with a diagnosis of rheumatoid arthritis.

These new classification criteria overruled the "old" ACR criteria of 1987 and are adapted for early RA diagnosis. The "new" classification criteria, jointly published by the American College of Rheumatology (ACR) and the European League Against Rheumatism (EULAR), establish a point value between 0 and 10. Four areas are covered in the diagnosis:

- joint involvement, designating the metacarpophalangeal joints, proximal interphalangeal joints, the interphalangeal joint of the thumb, second through fifth metatarsophalangeal joint and wrist as small joints, and shoulders, elbows, hip joints, knees, and ankles as large joints:
  - Involvement of 1 large joint gives 0 points
  - Involvement of 2–10 large joints gives 1 point
  - Involvement of 1–3 small joints (with or without involvement of large joints) gives 2 points
  - Involvement of 4–10 small joints (with or without involvement of large joints) gives 3 points
  - Involvement of more than 10 joints (with involvement of at least 1 small joint) gives 5 points
- serological parameters – including the rheumatoid factor as well as ACPA – "ACPA" stands for "anti-citrullinated protein antibody":
  - Negative RF and negative ACPA gives 0 points
  - Low-positive RF or low-positive ACPA gives 2 points
  - High-positive RF or high-positive ACPA gives 3 points
- acute phase reactants: 1 point for elevated erythrocyte sedimentation rate, ESR, or elevated CRP value (c-reactive protein)
- duration of arthritis: 1 point for symptoms lasting six weeks or longer

The new criteria incorporate the growing understanding of and the advances in diagnosing and treating RA. In the "new" criteria, serology and autoimmune diagnostics carry major weight, as ACPA detection is appropriate to diagnose the disease in an early state, before joints destructions occur. Destruction of the joints seen in radiological images was a significant point in the ACR criteria from 1987. This criterion is no longer regarded to be relevant, as this is just the type of damage that treatment is meant to avoid.

=== Differential diagnoses ===
Synovial fluid examination
Type	WBC (per mm^{3})	% neutrophils	Viscosity	Appearance
Normal	<200	0	High	Transparent
Osteoarthritis	<5000	<25	High	Clear yellow
Trauma	<10,000	<50	Variable	Bloody
Inflammatory	2,000–50,000	50–80	Low	Cloudy yellow
Septic arthritis	>50,000	>75	Low	Cloudy yellow
Gonorrhea	~10,000	60	Low	Cloudy yellow
Tuberculosis	~20,000	70	Low	Cloudy yellow
Inflammatory: Gout, rheumatoid arthritis, rheumatic fever

Several other medical conditions can resemble RA, and need to be distinguished from it at the time of diagnosis:

- Crystal induced arthritis (gout, and pseudogout) – usually involves particular joints (knee, MTP1, heels) and can be distinguished with an aspiration of joint fluid if in doubt. Redness, asymmetric distribution of affected joints, pain occurs at night, and the starting pain lasts for less than an hour, with gout.
- Osteoarthritis – distinguished with X-rays of the affected joints and blood tests, older age, starting pain less than an hour, asymmetric distribution of affected joints, and pain worsens when using the joint for longer periods.
- Systemic lupus erythematosus (SLE) – distinguished by specific clinical symptoms and blood tests (antibodies against double-stranded DNA)
- One of the several types of psoriatic arthritis resembles RA – nail changes and skin symptoms distinguish between them
- Lyme disease causes erosive arthritis and may closely resemble RA – it may be distinguished by a blood test in endemic areas
- Reactive arthritis – asymmetrically involves heel, sacroiliac joints and large joints of the leg. It is usually associated with urethritis, conjunctivitis, iritis, painless buccal ulcers, and keratoderma blennorrhagica.
- Axial spondyloarthritis (including ankylosing spondylitis) – this involves the spine, although an RA-like symmetrical small-joint polyarthritis may occur in the context of this condition.
- Hepatitis C – RA-like symmetrical small-joint polyarthritis may occur in the context of this condition. Hepatitis C may also induce rheumatoid factor auto-antibodies.

Rarer causes which usually behave differently but may cause joint pains:

- Sarcoidosis, amyloidosis, and Whipple's disease can also resemble RA.
- Hemochromatosis may cause hand joint arthritis.
- Acute rheumatic fever can be differentiated by a migratory pattern of joint involvement and evidence of antecedent streptococcal infection.
- Bacterial arthritis (such as by Streptococcus) is usually asymmetric, while RA usually involves both sides of the body symmetrically.
- Gonococcal arthritis (a bacterial arthritis) is also initially migratory and can involve tendons around the wrists and ankles.

Sometimes arthritis is in an undifferentiated stage (i.e., none of the above criteria is positive), even if synovitis is witnessed and assessed with ultrasound imaging.

=== Difficult-to-treat ===
Rheumatoid arthritis (D2T RA) is a specific classification RA by the European League against Rheumatism (EULAR).

Signs of illness:

1. Persistence of signs and symptoms
2. Drug resistance
3. Does not respond to two or more biological treatments
4. Does not respond to anti-rheumatic drugs with a different mechanism of action

Factors contributing to difficult-to-treat disease:

1. Genetic risk factors
2. Environmental factors (diet, smoking, physical activity)
3. Overweight and obese

=== Genetic factors ===
Genetic factors such as HLA-DR1B1, TRAF1, PSORS1C1 and microRNA 146a are associated with difficult-to-treat rheumatoid arthritis, other gene polymorphisms seem to be correlated with response to biologic modifying anti-rheumatic drugs (bDMARDs). The next one is the FOXO3A gene region been reported as associated with the worst disorder. The minor allele at FOXO3A summons a differential response of monocytes in RA patients. FOXO3A can provide an increase in pro-inflammatory cytokines, including TNFα. Possible gene polymorphism: STAT4, PTPN2, PSORS1C1 and TRAF3IP2 genes had been correlated with response to TNF inhibitors.

=== HLA-DR1 and HLA-DRB1 gene ===
The HLA-DRB1 gene is part of a family of genes called the human leukocyte antigen (HLA) complex. The HLA complex is the human version of the major histocompatibility complex (MHC). Currently, at least 2479 different versions of the HLA-DRB1 gene have been identified. The presence of HLA-DRB1 alleles seems to predict radiographic damage, which may be partially mediated by ACPA development, and also elevated sera inflammatory levels and high swollen joint count. HLA-DR1 is encoded by the most risk allele HLA-DRB1, which shares a conserved 5-aminoacid sequence that is correlated with the development of anti-citrullinated protein antibodies. HLA-DRB1 gene have more strong correlation with disease development. Susceptibility to and outcome for rheumatoid arthritis (RA) may be associated with particular HLA-DR alleles, but these alleles vary among ethnic groups and geographic areas.

=== MicroRNAs ===
MicroRNAs are a factor in the development of that type of disease. MicroRNAs usually operate as a negative regulator of the expression of target proteins, and their increased concentration after biologic treatment (bDMARDs) or after anti-rheumatic drugs. The levels of miRNA before and after anti-TNFa/DMRADs combination therapy are potential novel biomarkers for predicting and monitoring the outcome. For instance, some of them were found significantly upregulated by anti-TNFa/DMRADs combination therapy. For example, miRNA-16-5p, miRNA-23-3p, miRNA125b-5p, miRNA-126-3p, miRNA-146a-5p, miRNA-223-3p. Curious fact is that only responder patients showed an increase in those miRNAs after therapy, and paralleled the reduction of TNFα, interleukin (IL)-6, IL-17, rheumatoid factor (RF), and C-reactive protein (CRP).

=== Monitoring progression ===
Many tools can be used to monitor remission in rheumatoid arthritis.

- DAS28: Disease Activity Score of 28 joints (DAS28) is widely used as an indicator of RA disease activity and response to treatment. Joints included are (bilaterally): proximal interphalangeal joints (10 joints), metacarpophalangeal joints (10), wrists (2), elbows (2), shoulders (2) and knees (2). When looking at these joints, both the number of joints with tenderness upon touching (TEN28) and swelling (SW28) are counted. The erythrocyte sedimentation rate (ESR) is measured, and the affected person makes a subjective assessment (SA) of disease activity during the preceding 7 days on a scale between 0 and 100, where 0 is "no activity" and 100 is "highest activity possible". With these parameters, DAS28 is calculated as:

$DAS28=0.56 \times \sqrt{TEN28} + 0.28 \times \sqrt{SW28} + 0.70 \times \ln(ESR) + 0.014 \times SA$

From this, the disease activity of the affected person can be classified as follows:

Current DAS28		DAS28 decrease from initial value		
Current DAS28		> 1.2	> 0.6 but ≤ 1.2	≤ 0.6
≤ 3.2	Inactive	Good improvement	Moderate improvement	No improvement
> 3.2 but ≤ 5.1	Moderate	Moderate improvement	Moderate improvement	No improvement
> 5.1	Very active	Moderate improvement	No improvement	No improvement

It is not always a reliable indicator of treatment effect. One major limitation is that low-grade synovitis may be missed.

- Other: Other tools to monitor remission in rheumatoid arthritis are: ACR-EULAR Provisional Definition of Remission of Rheumatoid arthritis, Simplified Disease Activity Index and Clinical Disease Activity Index. Some scores do not require input from a healthcare professional and allow self-monitoring by the person, like HAQ-DI.

== Management ==
There is no cure for RA, but treatments can improve symptoms and slow the progression of the disease. Disease-modifying treatment has the best results when it is started early and aggressively. The results of a recent systematic review found that combination therapy with tumor necrosis factor (TNF) and non-TNF biologics plus methotrexate (MTX) resulted in improved disease control, Disease Activity Score (DAS)-defined remission, and functional capacity compared with a single treatment of either methotrexate or a biologic alone.

The goals of treatment are to minimize symptoms such as pain and swelling, to prevent bone deformity (for example, bone erosions visible in X-rays), and to maintain day-to-day functioning. This is primarily addressed with disease-modifying antirheumatic drugs (DMARDs); dosed physical activity; analgesics and physical therapy may be used to help manage pain. RA should generally be treated with at least one specific anti-rheumatic medication while combination therapies and corticosteroids are common in treatment. The use of benzodiazepines (such as diazepam) to treat the pain is not recommended as it does not appear to help and is associated with risks.

=== Lifestyle ===
Regular exercise is recommended as both safe and effective to maintain muscle strength and overall physical function. Physical activity is beneficial for people with rheumatoid arthritis who experience fatigue, although there was little to no evidence to suggest that exercise may have an impact on physical function in the long term, a study found that carefully dosed exercise has shown significant improvements in patients with RA. Physical activity increases the production of synovial fluid, which lubricates the joints and reduces friction. Moderate effects have been found for aerobic exercises and resistance training on cardiovascular fitness and muscle strength in RA. Furthermore, physical activity had no detrimental side effects like increased disease activity in any exercise dimension. It is uncertain if eating or avoiding specific foods or other specific dietary measures help improve symptoms, but several studies have shown that high-vegetable diets improve RA symptoms, whereas high-meat diets make symptoms worse. Occupational therapy has a positive role to play in improving functional ability in people with rheumatoid arthritis. Weak evidence supports the use of wax baths (thermotherapy) to treat arthritis in the hands.

Educational approaches that inform people about tools and strategies available to help them cope with rheumatoid arthritis may improve a person's psychological status and level of depression in the short term. Educating patients who have rheumatoid arthritis has shown a positive effect on how patients engage in their plan of care; the patient will be aware of fatigue, activity limitations, and pain and know possible side effects of how to manage this pain. Lack of knowledge can often lead to fear and limit adherence. Intervention by physical therapists plays a key role in offering proper tools for self-management, motivation in activities of daily living, and any assistive device use if needed. Patients will be assisted in managing neurological impairments and musculoskeletal stiffness to maximize strength and function. Encouraging patients to balance physical activity with their everyday living can prevent further joint damage and provide a sense of control.

The use of extra-depth shoes and molded insoles may reduce pain during weight-bearing activities such as walking. Insoles may also prevent the progression of bunions.

=== Disease-modifying agents ===
Disease-modifying antirheumatic drugs (DMARDs) are the primary treatment for RA. They are a diverse collection of drugs, grouped by use and convention. They have been found to improve symptoms, decrease joint damage, and improve overall functional abilities. DMARDs should be started early in the disease as they result in disease remission in approximately half of people and improved outcomes overall.

The following drugs are considered DMARDs: methotrexate, sulfasalazine, leflunomide, hydroxychloroquine, TNF inhibitors (certolizumab, adalimumab, infliximab and etanercept), abatacept, anakinra, and auranofin. Additionally, rituximab and tocilizumab are monoclonal antibodies and are also DMARDs. Use of tocilizumab is associated with a risk of increased cholesterol levels.

The most commonly used agent is methotrexate, with other frequently used agents including sulfasalazine and leflunomide. Leflunomide is effective when used for 6–12 months, with similar effectiveness to methotrexate when used for 2 years. Sulfasalazine also appears to be most effective in the short-term treatment of rheumatoid arthritis.

Hydroxychloroquine, in addition to its low toxicity profile, is considered effective for the treatment of moderate RA symptoms. Pharmacokinetic characteristics of Hydroxychloroquine are complex due to the large volume of distribution, significant tissue binding, and long terminal elimination half-life. Historically, terminal elimination half-lives were considered very long, 40–50 days for Hydroxychloroquine as compared to up to 60 days for Chloroquine. More recent studies suggest a shorter half-life of about 5 days. A long Hydroxychloroquine half-life is attributed to extensive tissue uptake rather than to an intrinsic inability to clear the drug. The expected delay in the attainment of steady-state concentrations (3–4 months) may be in part responsible for the slow therapeutic response observed with Hydroxychloroquine.

Agents may be used in combination, however, people may experience greater side effects. Methotrexate is the most important and useful DMARD and is usually the first treatment. A combined approach with methotrexate and biologics improves ACR50, HAQ scores and RA remission rates. This benefit from the combination of methotrexate with biologics occurs both when this combination is the initial treatment and when drugs are prescribed in a sequential or step-up manner. Triple therapy consisting of methotrexate, sulfasalazine and hydroxychloroquine may also effectively control disease activity. Adverse effects should be monitored regularly with toxicity including gastrointestinal, hematologic, pulmonary, and hepatic. Side effects such as nausea, vomiting or abdominal pain can be reduced by taking folic acid.

Rituximab combined with methotrexate appears to be more effective in improving symptoms compared to methotrexate alone. Rituximab works by decreasing levels of B-cells (an immune cell that is involved in inflammation). People taking rituximab had improved pain, function, reduced disease activity, and reduced joint damage based on X-ray images. After 6 months, 21% more people had improvement in their symptoms using rituximab and methotrexate.

Biological agents should generally be used only if methotrexate and other conventional agents are not effective after a trial of three months. They are associated with a higher rate of serious infections as compared to other DMARDs. Biological DMARD agents used to treat rheumatoid arthritis include: tumor necrosis factor alpha inhibitors (TNF inhibitors) such as infliximab; interleukin 1 blockers such as anakinra, monoclonal antibodies against B cells such as rituximab, interleukin 6 blockers such as tocilizumab, and T cell co-stimulation blockers such as abatacept. They are often used in combination with either methotrexate or leflunomide. Biologic monotherapy or tofacitinib with methotrexate may improve ACR50, RA remission rates and function. Abatacept should not be used at the same time as other biologics. In those who are well controlled (low disease activity) on TNF inhibitors, decreasing the dose does not appear to affect overall function. Discontinuation of TNF inhibitors (as opposed to gradually lowering the dose) by people with low disease activity may lead to increased disease activity and may affect remission, damage that is visible on an x-ray, and a person's function. There is not adequate data to suggest that age or disease activity impact radiographic disease progression for those taking methotrexate with or without TNF inhibitors. People should be screened for latent tuberculosis before starting any TNF inhibitor therapy to avoid reactivation of tuberculosis.

TNF inhibitors and methotrexate appear to have similar effectiveness when used alone, and better results are obtained when used together. Golimumab is effective when used with methotraxate. TNF inhibitors may have equivalent effectiveness, with etanercept appearing to be the safest. Injecting etanercept, in addition to methotrexate twice a week, may improve ACR50 and decrease radiographic progression for up to 3 years. Abatacept appears effective for RA with 20% more people improving with treatment than without but long term safety studies are yet unavailable. Adalimumab slows the time for the radiographic progression when used for 52 weeks. However, there is a lack of evidence to distinguish between the biologics available for RA. Issues with the biologics include their high cost and association with infections, including tuberculosis. Use of biological agents may reduce fatigue. The mechanism of how biologics reduce fatigue is unclear.

==== Gold and cyclosporin ====
Sodium aurothiomalate, auranofin, and cyclosporin are less commonly used due to more common adverse effects. However, cyclosporin was found to be effective in progressive RA when used up to one year.

==== Hydrogen Therapy ====
Patients with RA given H_{2}-water hydrogen therapy for four weeks showed significant improvement of symptoms.

=== Anti-inflammatory and analgesic agents ===
Glucocorticoids can be used in the short term and at the lowest dose possible for flare-ups and while waiting for slow-onset drugs to take effect. Combination of glucocorticoids and conventional therapy has shown a decrease in rate of erosion of bones. Steroids may be injected into affected joints during the initial period of RA, before the use of DMARDs or oral steroids.

Non-NSAID drugs to relieve pain, like paracetamol may be used to help alleviate the pain symptoms; they do not change the underlying disease. The use of paracetamol may be associated with the risk of developing ulcers.

NSAIDs reduce both pain and stiffness in those with RA but do not affect the underlying disease and appear to have no effect on people's long term disease course and thus are no longer first line agents. NSAIDs should be used with caution in those with gastrointestinal, cardiovascular, or kidney problems. Rofecoxib was withdrawn from the global market as its long-term use was associated to an increased risk of heart attacks and strokes. Use of methotrexate together with NSAIDs is safe, if adequate monitoring is done. COX-2 inhibitors, such as celecoxib, and NSAIDs are equally effective. A 2004 Cochrane review found that people preferred NSAIDs over paracetamol. However, it is yet to be clinically determined whether NSAIDs are more effective than paracetamol.

The neuromodulator agents, topical capsaicin, may be reasonable to use in an attempt to reduce pain. Nefopam by mouth and cannabis are not recommended as of 2012, as the risks of use appear to be greater than the benefits.

Limited evidence suggests the use of weak oral opioids, but the adverse effects may outweigh the benefits.

Alternatively, physical therapy has been tested and shown as an effective aid in reducing pain in patients with RA. As most RA is detected early and treated aggressively, physical therapy plays more of a preventive and compensatory role, aiding in pain management alongside regular rheumatic therapy.

=== Surgery ===
Especially for affected fingers, hands, and wrists, synovectomy may be needed to prevent pain or tendon rupture when drug treatment has failed. Severely affected joints may require joint replacement surgery, such as knee replacement. Postoperatively, physiotherapy is always necessary. There is insufficient evidence to support surgical treatment on arthritic shoulders.

=== Physiotherapy ===
For people with RA, physiotherapy may be used together with medical management. This may include cold and heat application, electronic stimulation, and hydrotherapy. Although medications improve symptoms of RA, muscle function is not regained when disease activity is controlled.

Physiotherapy promotes physical activity. In RA, physical activity like exercise in the appropriate dosage (frequency, intensity, time, type, volume, progression) and physical activity promotion is effective in improving cardiovascular fitness, muscle strength, and maintaining a long-term active lifestyle. Additionally, exercise can be useful for pain management in this population, specifically, conditioning exercise programs that include aerobic, isometric, and isotonic exercises. Due to the debilitating effects of the disease, people with RA can gain skills back through exercise because it increases the energy capacity of the muscles. In the short term, resistance exercises, with or without range of motion exercises, improve self-reported hand functions. Physical activity promotion according to the public health recommendations should be an integral part of standard care for people with RA and other arthritic diseases. Additionally, the combination of physical activities and cryotherapy show its efficacy on the disease activity and pain relief. The combination of aerobic activity and cryotherapy may be an innovative therapeutic strategy to improve the aerobic capacity in arthritis patients and consequently reduce their cardiovascular risk while minimizing pain and disease activity. Emerging rehabilitation strategies have also highlighted the benefits of low-intensity resistance training combined with blood flow restriction for individuals with rheumatoid arthritis. This rehabilitation approach allows patients to improve muscle strength, muscle hypertrophy, and functional performance while placing less mechanical stress on the affected joints, making it ideal for individuals experiencing pain, joint instability, or reduced tolerance to resistance exercise. Incorporating blood flow restriction training into physical therapy programs may be beneficial in supporting the maintenance of muscle function and independence in activities of daily living and is evidence based.

=== Compression gloves ===
Compression gloves are handwear designed to help prevent the occurrence of various medical disorders relating to blood circulation in the wrists and hands. They can be used to treat the symptoms of arthritis, though the medical benefits may be limited.

=== Alternative medicine ===
In general, there is not enough evidence to support any complementary health approaches for RA, with safety concerns for some of them. Some mind and body practices and dietary supplements may help people with symptoms and therefore may be beneficial additions to conventional treatments, but there is not enough evidence to draw conclusions. A systematic review of CAM modalities (excluding fish oil) found that " The available evidence does not support their current use in the management of RA." Studies showing beneficial effects in RA on a wide variety of CAM modalities are often affected by publication bias and are generally not high quality evidence such as randomized controlled trials (RCTs).

A 2005 Cochrane review states that low level laser therapy can be tried to improve pain and morning stiffness due to rheumatoid arthritis as there are few side-effects.

There is limited evidence that tai chi might improve the range of motion of a joint in persons with rheumatoid arthritis. The evidence for acupuncture is inconclusive with it appearing to be equivalent to sham acupuncture.

A Cochrane review in 2002 showed some benefits of electrical stimulation as a rehabilitation intervention to improve the power of the hand grip and help to resist fatigue. D‐penicillamine may provide similar benefits as DMARDs, but it is also highly toxic. Low-quality evidence suggests the use of therapeutic ultrasound on arthritic hands. Potential benefits include increased grip strength, reduced morning stiffness and number of swollen joints. There is tentative evidence of benefit of transcutaneous electrical nerve stimulation (TENS) in RA. Acupuncture‐like TENS (AL-TENS) may decrease pain intensity and improve muscle power scores.

Low-quality evidence suggests people with active RA may benefit from assistive technology. This may include less discomfort and difficulty such as when using an eye drop device. Balance training is of unclear benefits.

=== Dietary supplements ===
==== Fatty acids ====
There has been a growing interest in the role of long-chain omega-3 polyunsaturated fatty acids to reduce inflammation and alleviate the symptoms of RA. Metabolism of omega-3 polyunsaturated fatty acids produces docosahexaenoic acid (DHA) and eicosapentaenoic acid (EPA), which inhibit pro-inflammatory eicosanoids and cytokines (TNF-a, IL-1b, and IL-6), decreasing both lymphocyte proliferation and reactive oxygen species. These studies showed evidence for significant clinical improvements on RA in inflammatory status and articular index. Gamma-linolenic acid, an omega-6 fatty acid, may reduce pain, tender joint count, and stiffness, and is generally safe. For omega-3 polyunsaturated fatty acids (found in fish oil, flax oil and hemp oil), a meta-analysis reported a favorable effect on pain, although confidence in the effect was considered moderate. The same review reported less inflammation but no difference in joint function. A review examined the effect of marine oil omega-3 fatty acids on pro-inflammatory eicosanoid concentrations; leukotriene_{4} (LTB_{4}) was lowered in people with rheumatoid arthritis but not in those with non-autoimmune chronic diseases. Fish consumption has no association with RA. A fourth review limited inclusion to trials in which people eat ≥2.7 g/day for more than three months. The use of pain relief medication was decreased, but improvements in tender or swollen joints, morning stiffness, and physical function were unchanged. Collectively, the current evidence is not strong enough to determine that supplementation with omega-3 fatty acids or regular consumption of fish are effective treatments for rheumatoid arthritis.

==== Herbal ====
The American College of Rheumatology states that no herbal medicines have health claims supported by high-quality evidence and thus they do not recommend their use. There is no scientific basis to suggest that herbal supplements advertised as "natural" are safer for use than conventional medications as both are chemicals. Herbal medications, although labelled "natural", may be toxic or fatal if consumed. Due to the false belief that herbal supplements are always safe, there is sometimes a hesitancy to report their use which may increase the risk of adverse reactions.

=== Pregnancy ===
More than 75% of women with rheumatoid arthritis have symptoms that improve during pregnancy, but their symptoms worsen after delivery. Methotrexate and leflunomide are teratogenic (harmful to the fetus) and not used in pregnancy. It is recommended that women of childbearing age use contraceptives to avoid pregnancy and discontinue their use if pregnancy is planned. Low doses of prednisolone, hydroxychloroquine, and sulfasalazine are considered safe in pregnant women with rheumatoid arthritis. Prednisolone should be used with caution as the side effects include infections and fractures.

=== Vaccinations ===
People with RA have an increased risk of infections and mortality, and recommended vaccinations can reduce these risks. The inactivated influenza vaccine should be received annually. The pneumococcal vaccine should be administered twice for people under the age 65 and once for those over 65. Lastly, the live-attenuated zoster vaccine should be administered once after the age 60, but is not recommended in people on a tumor necrosis factor alpha blocker.

== Prognosis ==
Disability-adjusted life year for RA per 100,000 inhabitants in 2004. no data <40 40–50 50–60 60–70 70–80 80–90 90–100 100–110 110–120 120–130 130–140 >140

The course of the disease varies greatly. Some people have mild short-term symptoms, but in most the disease is progressive for life. Around 25% will have subcutaneous nodules (known as rheumatoid nodules); this is associated with a poor prognosis.

=== Prognostic factors ===
Poor prognostic factors include,

- Persistent synovitis
- Early erosive disease
- Extra-articular findings (including subcutaneous rheumatoid nodules)
- Positive serum RF findings
- Positive serum anti-CCP autoantibodies
- Positive serum 14-3-3η (YWHAH) levels above 0.5 ng/ml
- Carriership of HLA-DR4 "Shared Epitope" alleles
- Family history of RA
- Poor functional status
- Socioeconomic factors
- Elevated acute phase response (erythrocyte sedimentation rate [ESR], C-reactive protein [CRP])
- Increased clinical severity.
- Distance from primary care and specialist care in rural communities

=== Mortality ===
RA reduces lifespan on average from three to twelve years. Young age at onset, long disease duration, the presence of other health problems, and characteristics of severe RA – such as poor functional ability or overall health status, a lot of joint damage on x-rays, the need for hospitalisation or involvement of organs other than the joints – have been shown to associate with higher mortality. Positive responses to treatment may indicate a better prognosis. A 2005 study by the Mayo Clinic noted that individuals with RA have a doubled risk of heart disease, independent of other risk factors such as diabetes, excessive alcohol use, and elevated cholesterol, blood pressure and body mass index. The mechanism by which RA causes this increased risk remains unknown; the presence of chronic inflammation has been proposed as a contributing factor. It is possible that the use of new biologic drug therapies extend the lifespan of people with RA and reduce the risk and progression of atherosclerosis. This is based on cohort and registry studies, and remains hypothetical. It is uncertain whether biologics improve vascular function in RA. There was an increase in total cholesterol and HDLc levels, and no improvement in the atherogenic index.

== Epidemiology ==
Deaths from rheumatoid arthritis per million persons in 2012 0–0 1–1 2–3 4–5 6–6 7–8 9–9 10–12 13–20 21–55

RA affects 0.5–1% of adults in the developed world, with between 5 and 50 per 100,000 people newly developing the condition each year. In 2010, it resulted in about 49,000 deaths globally.

Onset is uncommon under the age of 15, and from then on, the incidence rises with age until the age of 80. Women are affected three to five times as often as men.

The age at which the disease most commonly starts is in women between 40 and 50 years of age, and for men, somewhat later. RA is a chronic disease, and although rarely, a spontaneous remission may occur, the common course of progression consists of persistent symptoms that wax and wane in intensity, along with continued deterioration of joint structures, leading to deformation and disability.

There is an association between periodontitis and rheumatoid arthritis (RA), hypothesised to lead to enhanced generation of RA-related autoantibodies. Oral bacteria that invade the blood may also contribute to chronic inflammatory responses and the generation of autoantibodies.

== History ==
The first recognized description of RA in modern medicine was in 1800 by the French physician Augustin Jacob Landré-Beauvais (1772–1840) who was based in the famed Salpêtrière Hospital in Paris. The name "rheumatoid arthritis" itself was coined in 1859 by British rheumatologist Alfred Baring Garrod.

The art of Peter Paul Rubens may depict the effects of RA. In his later paintings, his rendered hands show, in the opinion of some physicians, increasing deformity consistent with the symptoms of the disease. RA appears to some to have been depicted in 16th-century paintings. However, it is generally recognized in art historical circles that the painting of hands in the 16th and 17th century followed certain stylized conventions, most clearly seen in the Mannerist movement. It was conventional, for instance, to show the upheld right hand of Christ in what now appears a deformed posture. These conventions are easily misinterpreted as portrayals of disease.

Historic (though not necessarily effective) treatments for RA have also included: rest, ice, compression and elevation, apple diet, nutmeg, some light exercise every now and then, nettles, bee venom, copper bracelets, rhubarb diet, extractions of teeth, fasting, honey, vitamins, insulin, magnets, and electroconvulsive therapy (ECT).

=== Etymology ===
Rheumatoid arthritis is derived from the Greek word ῥεύμα-rheuma (nom.), ῥεύματος-rheumatos (gen.) ("flow, current"). The suffix -oid ("resembling") gives the translation as joint inflammation that resembles rheumatic fever. Rhuma, which means watery discharge, might refer to the fact that the joints are swollen or that the disease may be made worse by wet weather.

== Research ==
Meta-analysis found an association between periodontal disease and RA, but the mechanism of this association remains unclear. Two bacterial species associated with periodontitis are implicated as mediators of protein citrullination in the gums of people with RA.

Vitamin D deficiency is more common in people with rheumatoid arthritis than in the general population. However, whether vitamin D deficiency is a cause or a consequence of the disease remains unclear. One meta-analysis found that vitamin D levels are low in people with rheumatoid arthritis and that vitamin D status correlates inversely with prevalence of rheumatoid arthritis, suggesting that vitamin D deficiency is associated with susceptibility to rheumatoid arthritis.

The fibroblast-like synoviocytes have a prominent role in the pathogenic processes of the rheumatic joints, and therapies that target these cells are emerging as promising therapeutic tools, raising hope for future applications in rheumatoid arthritis.

Possible links with intestinal barrier dysfunction are investigated.

== See also ==
- Osteoarthritis
- Reactive arthritis
- Psoriatic arthritis
- Weather pains
