= Nodule (medicine) =

Solid, non-blisterform elevated areas in or under the skin

- Specialty: Pathology

In medicine, a nodule is a small, discrete lump or growth that is different from surrounding tissue. They are often detected by medical imaging and can be either benign or malignant.

Definitions vary by medical specialty. In dermatology, nodules are usually greater than 1 cm in diameter, in contrast to raised, soft bumps of less than 1 cm, which are termed papules, and to cysts, which contain fluid. In pulmonology, when imaging the lungs by radiography, a nodule is a round, focal opacity in the lung tissue of less than 3 cm in diameter, with lesions larger than that instead termed masses. In endocrinology, a thyroid nodule is a lump formed by abnormal growth.

Nodules in skin include dermatofibroma and pyogenic granuloma. Nodules may form on tendons and muscles in response to injury, and are frequently found on vocal cords. They may occur in organs such as the lung, or thyroid, or be a sign in other medical conditions such as rheumatoid arthritis.

== Characteristics ==
Nodules are small, firm lumps found in skin and other organs.

== Evaluation ==
The evaluation of a skin nodule includes a description of its appearance, its location, how it feels to touch and any associated symptoms which may give clues to an underlying medical condition.

Often discovered unintentionally on a chest x-ray, a single nodule in the lung requires assessment to exclude cancer.

== Conditions ==
Nodules may form on tendons and muscles in response to injury, and are frequently found on vocal cords. They occur in conditions including endometriosis, neurofibromatosis, and in rheumatoid arthritis. They may also feature in Kaposi's sarcoma and gonorrhea.

=== Other examples ===
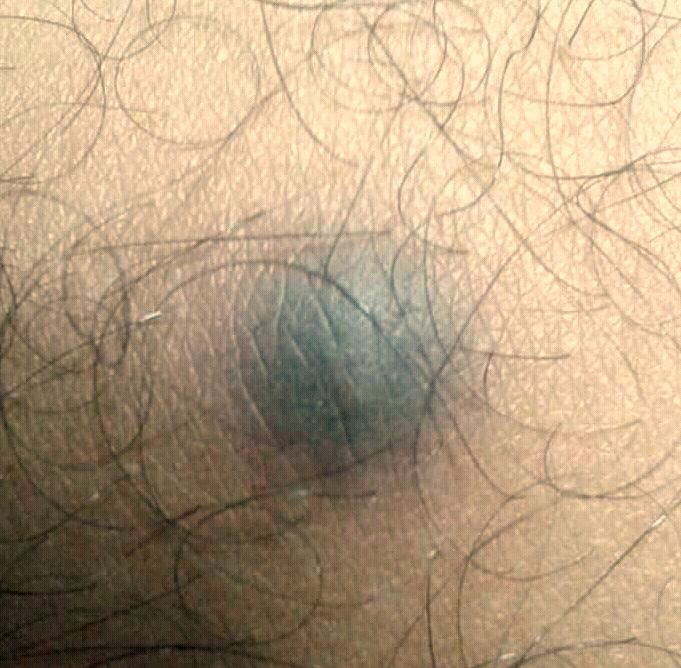
Dermatofibroma

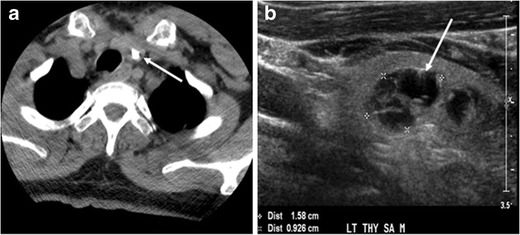
CT (L) and ultrasound (R) of thyroid colloid nodule with calcification

Lung nodule

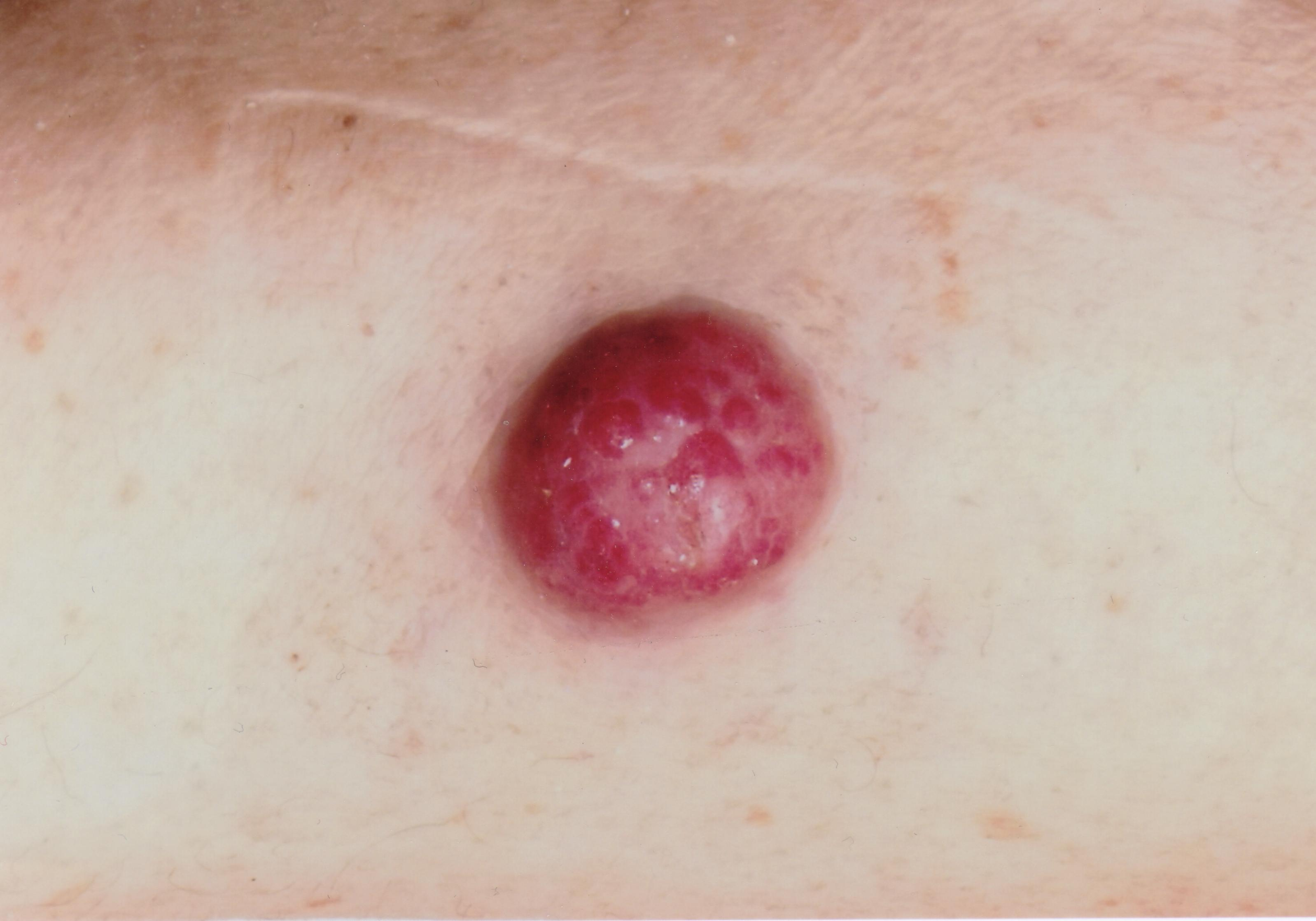
Merkel cell carcinoma

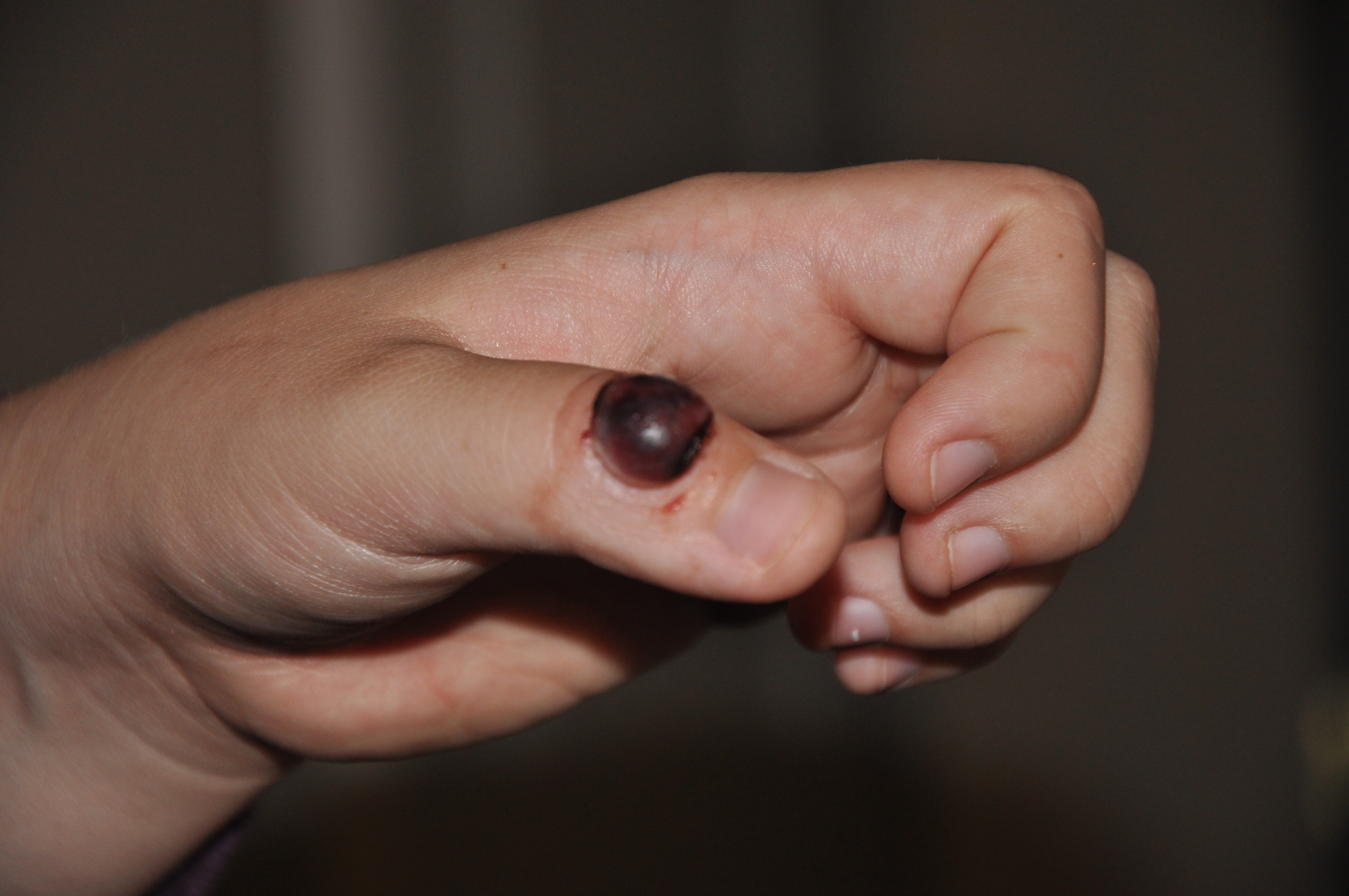
Pyogenic granuloma

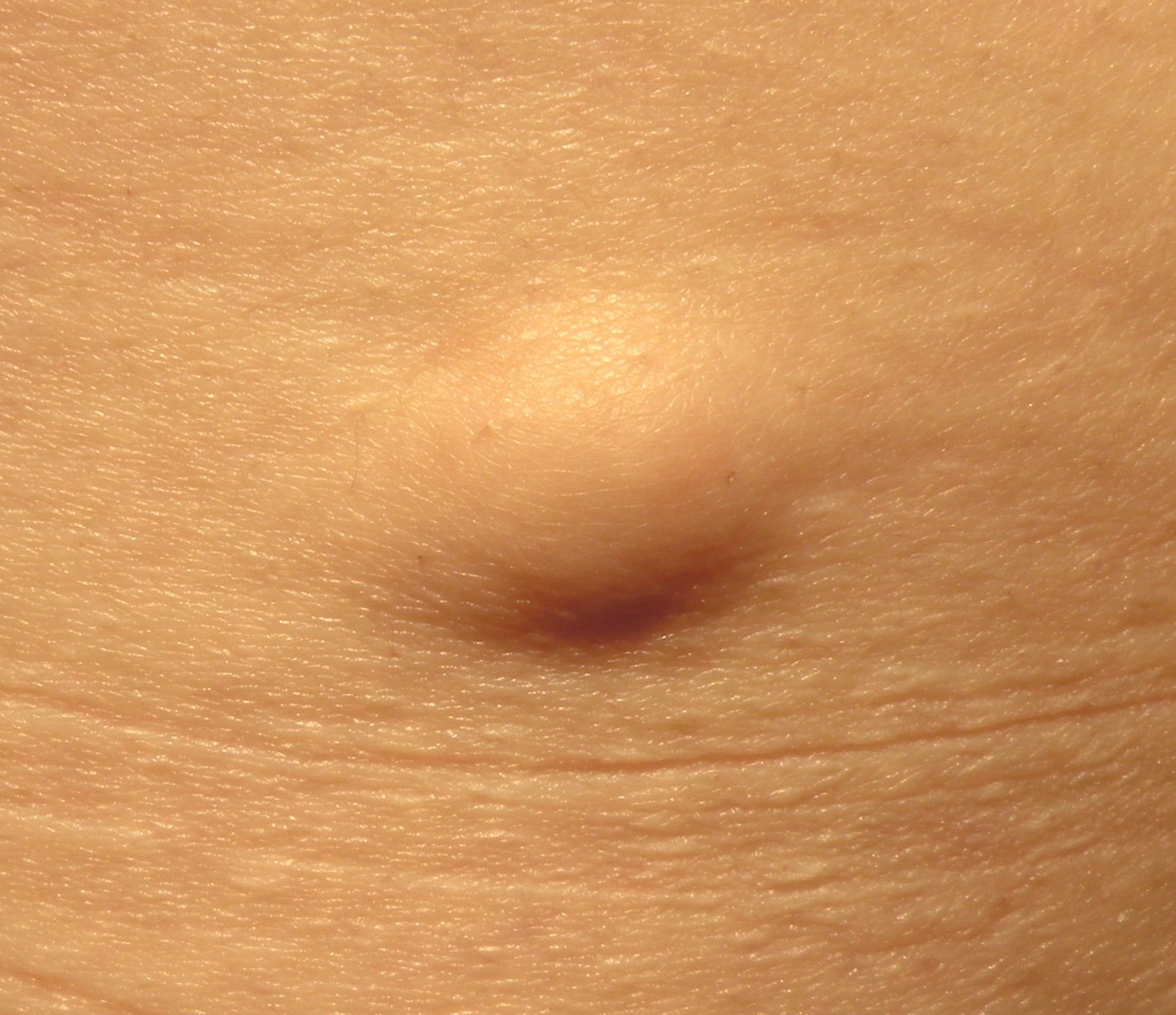
Lipoma
