= Prosorba column =

Plasma filtering device

The Prosorba Column is a plasma filtering device used to treat severe cases of rheumatoid arthritis or psoriatic arthritis. Its active element is Protein A bonded to a diatomaceous earth/clay bead. The effect of the Protein A is to remove circulating immune complexes responsible for the autoimmune joint deterioration process.

The device was originally manufactured by Imre Corp and approved by the FDA in 1987. The Prosorba Column went out of production at the end of 2006.
