= B39 =

B39 or B-39 may refer to:

- Bundesstraße 39, a German road
- B39 nuclear bomb
- XB-39 Superfortress
- Soviet submarine B-39, a Foxtrot class submarine
- HLA-B39, an HLA-B serotype
- B39 (New York City bus)
