= RMDN3 =

Protein-coding gene in the species Homo sapiens

Identifiers
- Aliases: RMDN3, FAM82A2, FAM82C, RMD-3, RMD3, ptpip51, regulator of microtubule dynamics 3
- External IDs: OMIM: 611873; MGI: 1915059; GeneCards: RMDN3

Gene location (Human)
Chr.	Chromosome 15 (human)
Band	15q15.1	Start	40,735,884 bp
Band	15q15.1	End	40,755,851 bp

Gene location (Mouse)
Chr.	Chromosome 2 (mouse)
Band	2|2 E5	Start	118,967,482 bp
Band	2|2 E5	End	118,987,515 bp
RNA expression pattern
Bgee	Human / Mouse (ortholog); Top expressed in: mucosa of ileum; C1 segment; cerebellar hemisphere; right hemisphere of cerebellum; jejunal mucosa; anterior cingulate cortex; prefrontal cortex; right frontal lobe; amygdala; duodenum / Top expressed in: retinal pigment epithelium; lobe of cerebellum; seminal vesicula; cerebellar vermis; jejunum; neural layer of retina; olfactory epithelium; mucous cell of stomach; brown adipose tissue; dorsal tegmental nucleus; More reference expression data
BioGPS	n/a
Gene ontology
Molecular function	protein binding
Cellular component	cytoplasm; integral component of membrane; mitochondrial outer membrane; spindle; spindle pole; microtubule; cytoskeleton; membrane; mitochondrion; nucleus; mitochondrial membranes
Biological process	cell differentiation; cellular calcium ion homeostasis; apoptotic process
Sources:Amigo / QuickGO
Orthologs
Databases	NCBI: entry; OMA: entry
Species	Human	Mouse
Entrez	55177	67809
Ensembl	ENSG00000137824	ENSMUSG00000070730
UniProt	Q96TC7	Q3UJU9
RefSeq (mRNA)	NM_001304802; NM_018145; NM_001323894; NM_001323895; NM_001323896 NM_001323897	NM_001033136
RefSeq (protein)	NP_001291731; NP_001310823; NP_001310824; NP_001310825; NP_001310826 NP_060615	NP_001028308
Location (UCSC)	Chr 15: 40.74 – 40.76 Mb	Chr 2: 118.97 – 118.99 Mb
PubMed search
- Wikidata
View/Edit Human	View/Edit Mouse

Regulator of microtubule dynamics protein 3 (RMDN3), more commonly known as Protein tyrosine phosphatase interacting protein 51 (PTPIP51), is a protein that in humans is encoded by the RMDN3 gene on chromosome 15. This protein contributes to multiple biological functions, including cellular differentiation, proliferation, motility, cytoskeleton formation, and apoptosis, and has been associated with numerous cancers.

== Structure ==
PTPIP51 contains two conserved domains, called conserved region 1 (CR1) and conserved region 2 (CR2), which serve as binding sites for 14-3-3 proteins. Close to these conserved domains are two tyrosine residues, tyrosine 53 and 158, which serve as phosphorylation sites for various kinases. In addition, PTPIP51 has a mitochondrial targeting sequence at its N-terminal which is responsible for inducing apoptosis, though some splicing variants lack this sequence. It also contains a 33-residue coiled coil domain at positions 92 – 124. Crystal structure of TPR domain of PTPIP51 was determined.

== Function ==
PTPIP51 is a member of the RMDN protein family and localizes to the outer mitochondrial membrane, cytoplasm, and nucleus. This protein is involved in cellular differentiation, proliferation, motility, cytoskeleton formation, and apoptosis. These biological functions thus serve to facilitate mammalian development through processes such as placental villi formation and angiogenesis. In particular, it is expressed in differentiated cells and tissues, such as follicular and inter-follicular epidermis, epithelia, skeletal muscle, testis, and nervous tissue. PTPIP51 is also expressed differentially in neutrophils, but not other immune cells, and thus may partake in immune cell signaling and myeloid development by interacting with TCPTP and PTP1B. Its interactions with PTP1B, along with the proteins 14-3-3β, Raf-1, c-Src, PKA, and DAGKα, determine the mechanisms by which it influences the mitogen-activated protein kinase (MAPK) pathway. PTPIP51 has been observed to induce apoptosis by disrupting the mitochondrial membrane potential, resulting in the release of cytochrome c. In vitro phospholipid binding and transfer functions has been reported

== Clinical significance ==
There is currently little known about the RMDN3 protein with respect to its clinical significance other than an apparent role in oncology. The main mechanism for the RMDN3 protein is its role as an apoptotic constituent. During a normal embryologic processes, or during cell injury (such as ischemia-reperfusion injury during heart attacks and strokes) or during developments and processes in cancer, an apoptotic cell undergoes structural changes including cell shrinkage, plasma membrane blebbing, nuclear condensation, and fragmentation of the DNA and nucleus. This is followed by fragmentation into apoptotic bodies that are quickly removed by phagocytes, thereby preventing an inflammatory response. It is a mode of cell death defined by characteristic morphological, biochemical and molecular changes. It was first described as a "shrinkage necrosis", and then this term was replaced by apoptosis to emphasize its role opposite mitosis in tissue kinetics. In later stages of apoptosis the entire cell becomes fragmented, forming a number of plasma membrane-bounded apoptotic bodies which contain nuclear and or cytoplasmic elements. The ultrastructural appearance of necrosis is quite different, the main features being mitochondrial swelling, plasma membrane breakdown and cellular disintegration. Apoptosis occurs in many physiological and pathological processes. It plays an important role during embryonal development as programmed cell death and accompanies a variety of normal involutional processes in which it serves as a mechanism to remove "unwanted" cells.

Both the protein and mRNA of PTPIP51 have been implicated in various carcinomas, including prostate carcinoma (PCa), keratinocyte carcinoma, basal cell carcinomas, and squamous cell carcinomas. It is hypothesized that overexpression of PTPIP51 in PCa results from retrotransposon elements activated by CpG island hypomethylation, which has been observed in late prostate carcinogenesis. Moreover, the protein has been observed to interact with PTP1B to influence the MAPK pathway in acute myeloid leukemia. In addition to cancers, PTPIP51 has been associated with benign prostate hyperplasia (BPH) and, by extension, with BPH-related conditions, including aging and lower urinary tract dysfunction.

== Interactions ==
RMDN3 has been shown to interact with:

- PTP1B,
- TCPTP,
- c-Src,
- 14-3-3β,
- 14-3-3γ,
- Raf-1,
- PKA,
- DAGKα, and
- VAPB.
