= B38 =

B38 may refer to:

- Sicilian Defence, Accelerated Dragon, Encyclopaedia of Chess Openings code
- Bundesstraße 38, a German road
- XB-38 Flying Fortress, an experimental aircraft
- BMW B38 engine, a straight-3 automobile engine
- B38 (New York City bus) in Brooklyn
- HLA-B38, an HLA-B serotype
