= Psoriatic arthritis =

Long-term inflammatory arthritis

- Other names: Arthritis psoriatica, arthropathic psoriasis, psoriatic arthropathy, psoriatic disease.
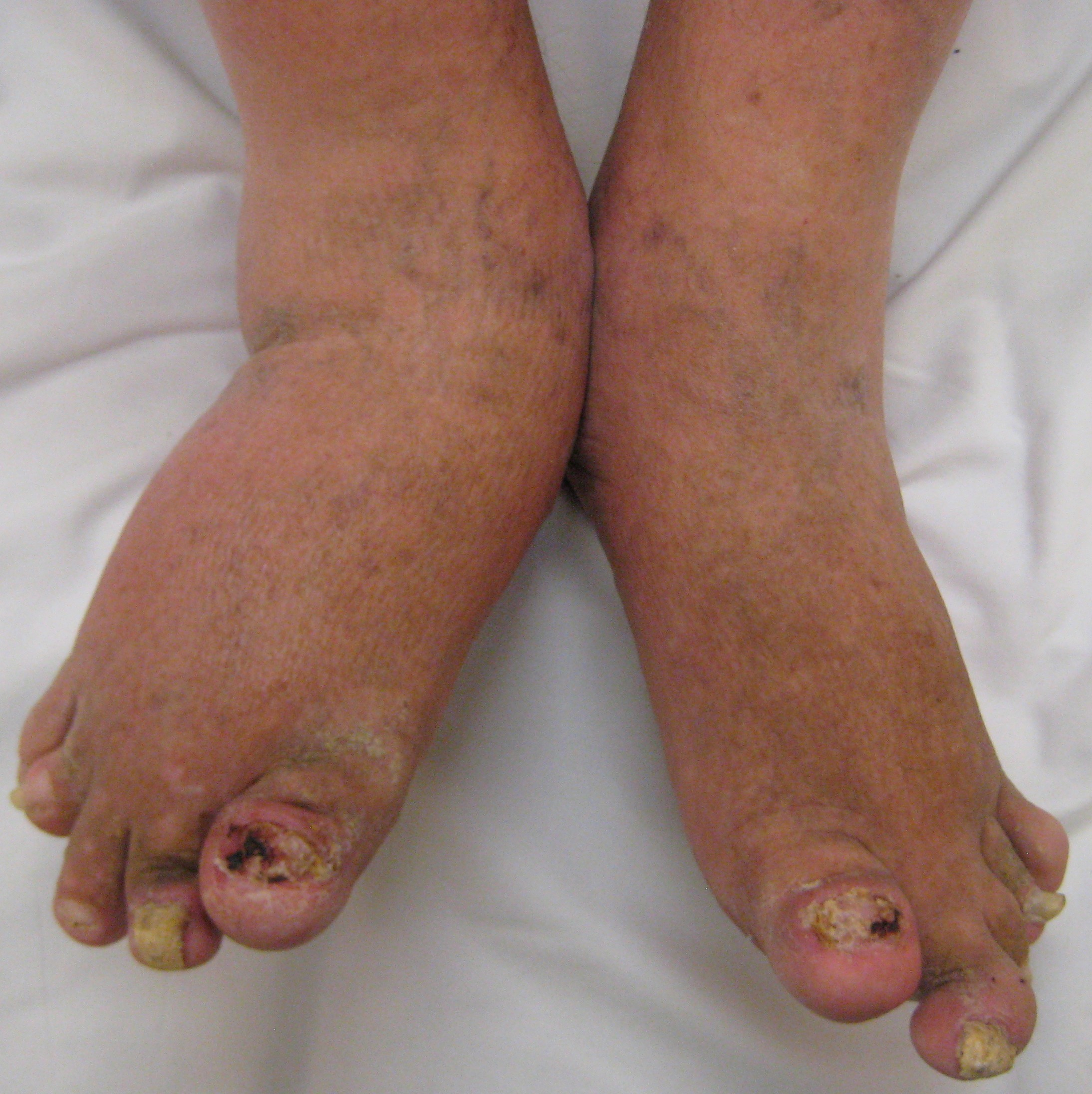
- Severe psoriatic arthritis of both feet and ankles. There is also damage to the nails.
- Specialty: Rheumatology

Psoriatic arthritis (PsA) is a chronic inflammatory arthritis. The classic features of psoriatic arthritis include enthesitis (inflammation of the entheses), synovitis (inflammation of the joint membrane), and dactylitis (sausage-like swelling of the fingers). It particularly affects the peripheral joints, the spine, and the sacroiliac joints. PsA also often presents with nail lesions, which may include small depressions in the nail (pitting), thickening of the nails, and detachment of the nail from the nailbed.

PsA affects people with the autoimmune disease psoriasis in particular, and about 20–30% of patients with psoriasis develop PsA. However, 10–30% of patients who develop PsA do not have psoriasis at the time of diagnosis. It is not clear if the two diseases are distinct disease entities or one disease.

PsA is classified as a type of seronegative spondyloarthropathy, and is a clinical diagnosis. There are no reliable tests for PsA.

Genetics are thought to be strongly involved in the development of psoriatic arthritis. Obesity and certain forms of psoriasis are thought to increase the risk.

PsA occurs in both children and adults, and affects men and women equally. The condition is less common in people of Asian or African descent.

== Signs and symptoms ==
The signs and symptoms of psoriatic arthritis are very variable from one individual to the next. Symptoms usually appear after age 30.

=== Peripheral joints ===
The majority of patients with PsA experience peripheral joint involvement. Pain, swelling, or stiffness in one or more joints is commonly present in psoriatic arthritis. Psoriatic arthritis is inflammatory, and affected joints are generally red or warm to the touch. Asymmetrical oligoarthritis, defined as inflammation affecting two to four joints during the first six months of disease, is present in 70% of cases. However, in 15% of cases, the arthritis is symmetrical.

The joints of the hand that are involved in psoriasis are the proximal interphalangeal, the distal interphalangeal, the metacarpophalangeal joint, and the wrist. Involvement of the distal interphalangeal joints is a characteristic feature in many cases.

Sausage-like swelling in the fingers or toes, known as dactylitis, occurs in about 40% of PsA cases.

PsA may cause shoulder pain, most commonly felt in the front of the shoulder or the upper part of the arm. It is usually felt when moving the arm and may only be noticed in certain movements. In addition, many people find it painful when lying on the sore side in bed at night.

=== Axial skeleton (spine) ===
Approximately 25–70% of PsA patients have inflammation of the axial skeleton. There are also post inflammatory changes. Axial pain can occur in the area of the sacrum (the lower back, above the tailbone), as a result of sacroiliitis or spondylitis, which is present in 40% of cases. The inflammatory pain in the axial skeleton is worse in the early hours of the day. The pain is not relieved by resting, but rather by movement. The pain may be located in only part of the spine or sacroiliac joints, and may radiate to the legs down to the level of the back of the knee. It may be on both sides or only one side. There may also be stiffness and reduction of mobility in the spine. There are no symptoms in 20% of people with axial involvement. Over time, the spine may undergo ankylosis.

=== Nails ===
Nail psoriasis (also termed psoriatic onychopathy) occurs in 80 to 90% of PsA cases. When PsA affects the finger joints, usually the distal interphalangeal joint is involved, which is the joint closest to the nail. The changes in the nails may only be very minimal, such as minor pits of the nail surface. The nails may be discolored (e.g., "oil spots"). There may be subungual (under the nail) hyperkeratosis. The nail may separate from the nail bed, which is termed onycholysis.

=== Psoriasis (skin) ===
Psoriasis classically presents with scaly skin lesions, which are most commonly seen over extensor surfaces such as the scalp, natal cleft, and umbilicus. Plaque-like psoriasis (psoriasis vulgaris) is the most frequent type of psoriasis in persons with PsA, but other types of psoriasis skin lesions are possible. 20-30% of people with psoriasis develop PsA.

=== Enthesitis ===
Enthesitis is inflammation of an enthesis (the site where a tendon or ligament attaches to a bone). In PsA, enthesitis most often occurs at the attachment of the calcaneal tendon (Achilles tendon). It may also occur at the epicondyles of the elbow, plantar fascia, tendon of the quadriceps muscle, patella (knee bone), iliac crest (part of the hip), rotator cuff attachment, or supraspinatus attachment.

Enthesitis is sometimes considered a hallmark sign of PsA. Sometimes it may appear before any other sign of PsA or be the only sign of the disease. The same person may have multiple sites with enthesitis. Overall, enthesitis occurs in 42% of people with PsA. However, this figure varies significantly from 6% to 72% in reports. Enthesitis in PsA is associated with more active disease and the coexistence of fibromyalgia.

Enthesitis, if present, may cause pain over a wider area around the joint. Pain can also occur in and around the feet and ankles, especially if there is enthesitis in the Achilles tendon or plantar fasciitis in the sole of the foot.

=== Fatigue ===
Severe fatigue is present in approximately 30% of patients with PsA. It is sometimes described as extreme exhaustion that does not go away with adequate rest. The fatigue may be caused directly by the disease itself, or be a secondary effect of other factors.

Poor sleep quality is common among people with psoriatic arthritis.

=== Psychological ===
PsA is associated with anxiety and depression. People with the condition may have reduced participation in social activities and become socially isolated.

=== Pattern of disease activity ===
Psoriatic arthritis may remain mild or progress to destructive joint disease. Periods of active disease, or flares, will typically alternate with periods of remission. In severe forms, psoriatic arthritis may progress to arthritis mutilans which on X-ray gives a "pencil-in-cup" appearance.

=== Complications ===
Rare complications are uveitis in one or both eyes, slightly higher risk of heart conditions, and increased risk of Crohn's disease and of metabolic dysfunction–associated steatotic liver disease (MASLD). Other potential comorbidities which may occur together with PsA include hypertension (high blood pressure), obesity, diabetes, metabolic syndrome, cardiovascular disease, fibromyalgia, osteoporosis, and infections.

While people with psoriasis have a slightly increased risk of cancer (especially lymphoma and keratinocyte cancer), there is very limited evidence available about any possible link between PsA and cancer. From available evidence, there does not appear to be any increased risk of cancer, apart perhaps from breast cancer.

== Causes ==
Psoriatic arthritis is an inheritable polygenic disease, with many genes known or theorized to contribute to its clinical presentation (or lack thereof). When someone with the genes for psoriatic arthritis comes into contact with certain substances, these substances may induce an autoimmune reaction, causing the immune system to target normal tissues in the body. The exact strength, location, and clinical effects of this reaction depend on which genes are involved for each individual. The substance that triggers the reaction is typically not known.

Genomic analysis has identified several genes involved in some patients, notably genes related to class I MHC including HLA-B*08, HLA-B*27, HLA-B*38, and HLA-B*39. Other genes relating to the immune system and central tolerance may also be involved, such as interleukin receptor genes. Thematically, these genes are often those that identify human tissues as normal and healthy, or the genes in immune cells designed to recognize those identifiers. In the case of psoriatic arthritis, the genes targeting immune cells are overexpressed, which leads to an increase in the recruitment of phagocytic neutrophils present in psoriatic skin lesions, hereby increasing inflammation and phagocytosis of healthy cells. If the genes are functioning abnormally, then the immune system has a higher risk of attacking normal tissues.

Bone cells such as osteoclasts are theorized to be involved in patients with psoriatic arthritis, in contrast to most people with psoriasis whose bone cells are not significantly involved in the disease.

=== HLA-B27 ===
Approximately 40–50% of individuals with psoriatic arthritis have the HLA-B27 genotype. Whilst the incidence of psoriatic arthritis is significantly higher among people positive for HLA-B27 (compared to the overall population), the vast majority of people with HLA-B27 will not have psoriatic arthritis. For instance in the US HLA-B27 incidence is 6–8%, whilst psoriatic arthritis incidence has been estimated at 0.06–0.25%.

=== Risk factors ===
Health and environmental factors known to be associated with psoriatic arthritis include:

- Current, or history of, severe psoriasis
- Disease of the finger/toenails
- Obesity
- Tissue trauma, or deep lesions associated with sites of trauma
- Smoking.
- Alcohol.

== Diagnosis ==
There is no definitive test to diagnose psoriatic arthritis. Several classification criteria have been proposed, but they have wide variability. A rheumatologist (a physician specializing in autoimmune diseases) may use physical examinations, health history, blood tests, ultrasound imaging, MRI imaging, and X-ray imaging to accurately diagnose psoriatic arthritis.

Factors that contribute to a diagnosis of psoriatic arthritis include the following:

- Psoriasis in the patient, or a family history of psoriasis or psoriatic arthritis.
- A negative test result for rheumatoid factor, anti-CCP antibodies, and antinuclear antibodies, which are biomarkers associated with other autoimmune diseases such as rheumatoid arthritis and lupus.
- Arthritis symptoms in the distal interphalangeal articulations of hand (the joints closest to the tips of the fingers). This is not typical of rheumatoid arthritis.
- Active inflammation in the joints and entheses, such as synovitis, tenosynovitis, vascularization, and entheseal lesions, which are visible in doppler ultrasound and MRI.
- Ridging or pitting of fingernails or toenails (onycholysis), which is associated with psoriasis and psoriatic arthritis.
- Radiologic images demonstrating degenerative joint damage. PsA presents with both erosions and new bone growth, whereas rheumatoid arthritis only causes erosions.

Other symptoms that are more typical of psoriatic arthritis than other forms of arthritis include enthesitis (inflammation in the Achilles tendon (at the back of the heel) or the plantar fascia (bottom of the feet)), and dactylitis (sausage-like swelling of the fingers or toes). Enthesitis also occurs in axial spondyloarthritis.

=== Imaging ===
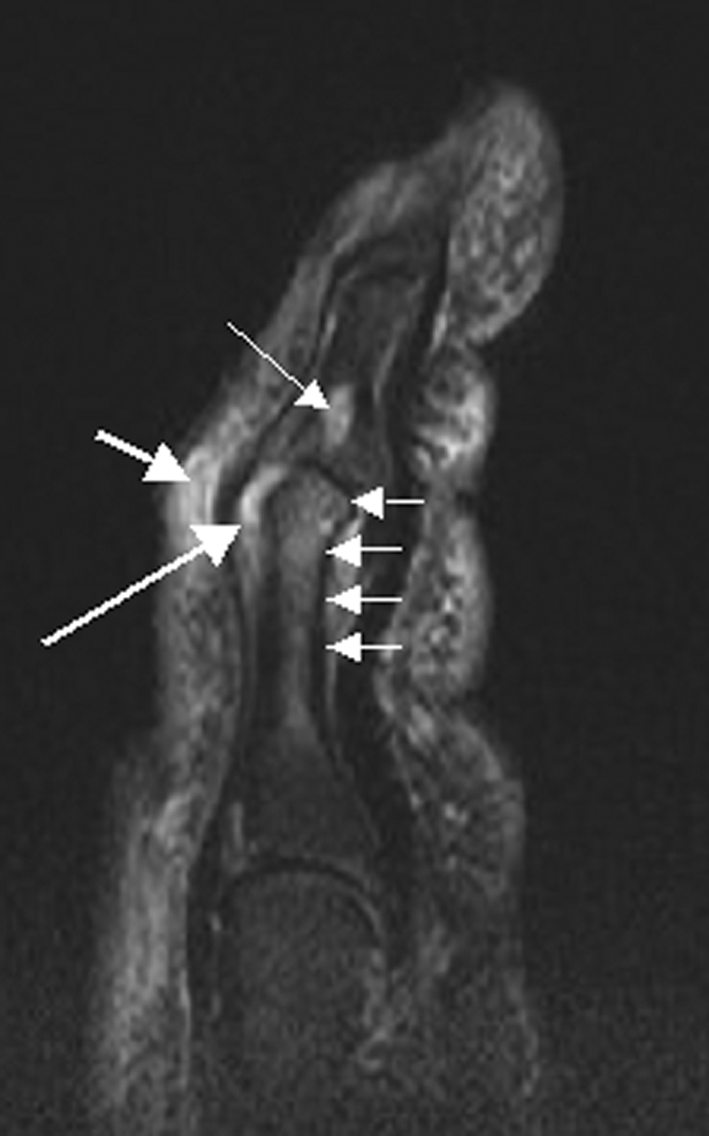
T2-weighted MRI (sagittal) of index finger in PsA (mutilans form) showing probable erosion (increased signal) at base of the middle phalanx (long thin arrow), synovitis at the proximal interphalangeal joint (long thick arrow), soft tissue edema (short thick arrow), and diffuse bone edema (short thin arrows) of the proximal phalanx.

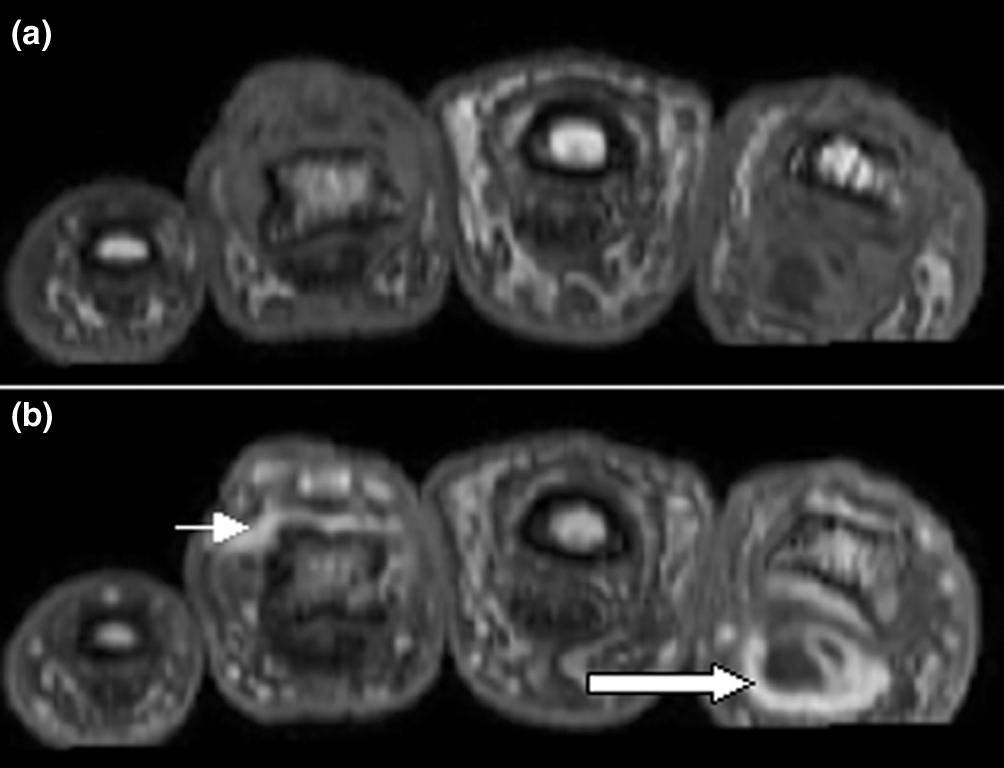
T1 weighted axial MRIs of the fingers in PsA. (a) Pre- and (b) post-contrast showing dactylitis due to flexor tenosynovitis at the second finger with enhancement and thickening of the tendon sheath (large arrow), and synovitis at proximal interphalangeal joint (small arrow).

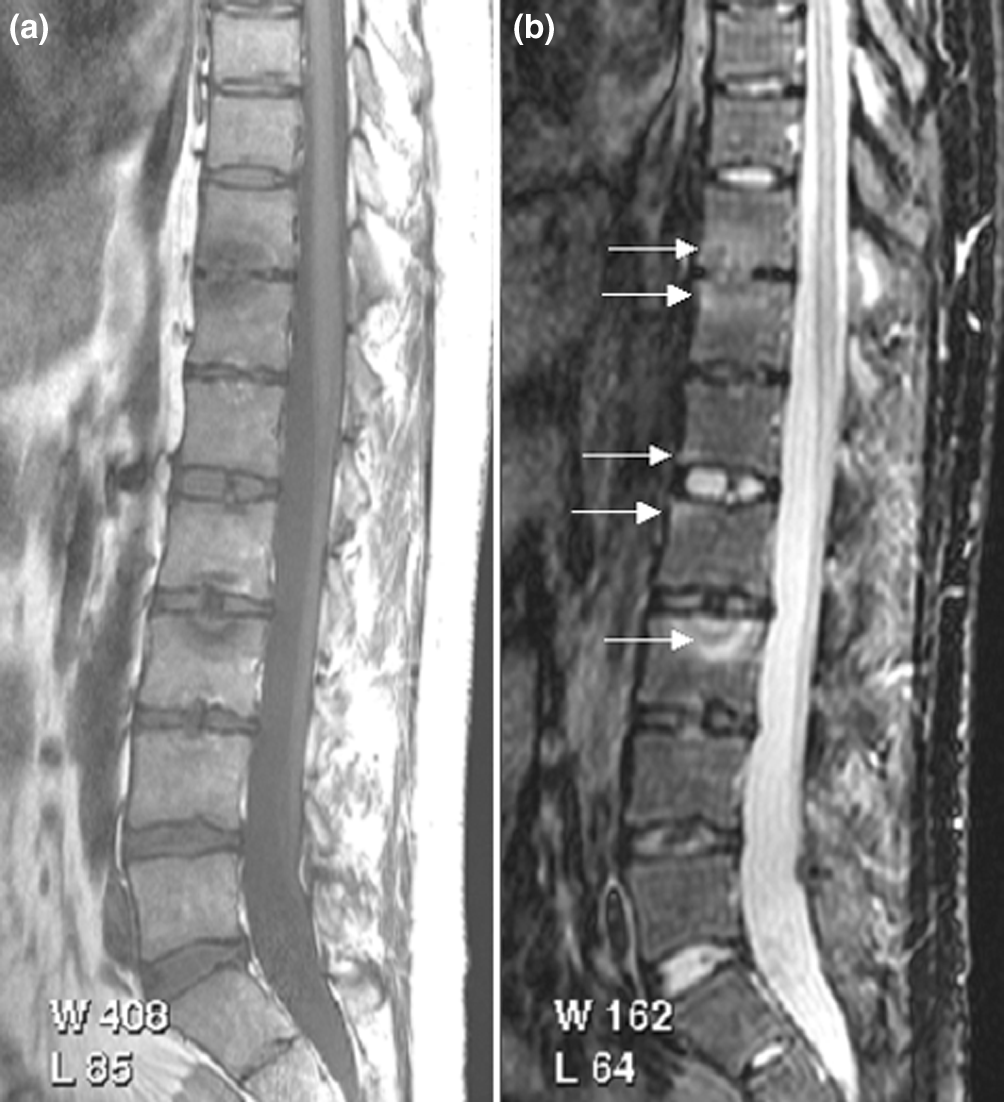
(a) T1-weighted and (b) STIR MRI of lumbar and lower thoracic spine in PsA showing active inflammation at several levels (arrows), anterior spondylitis at L1/L2, and an inflammatory Andersson lesion at the upper vertebral endplate of L3.

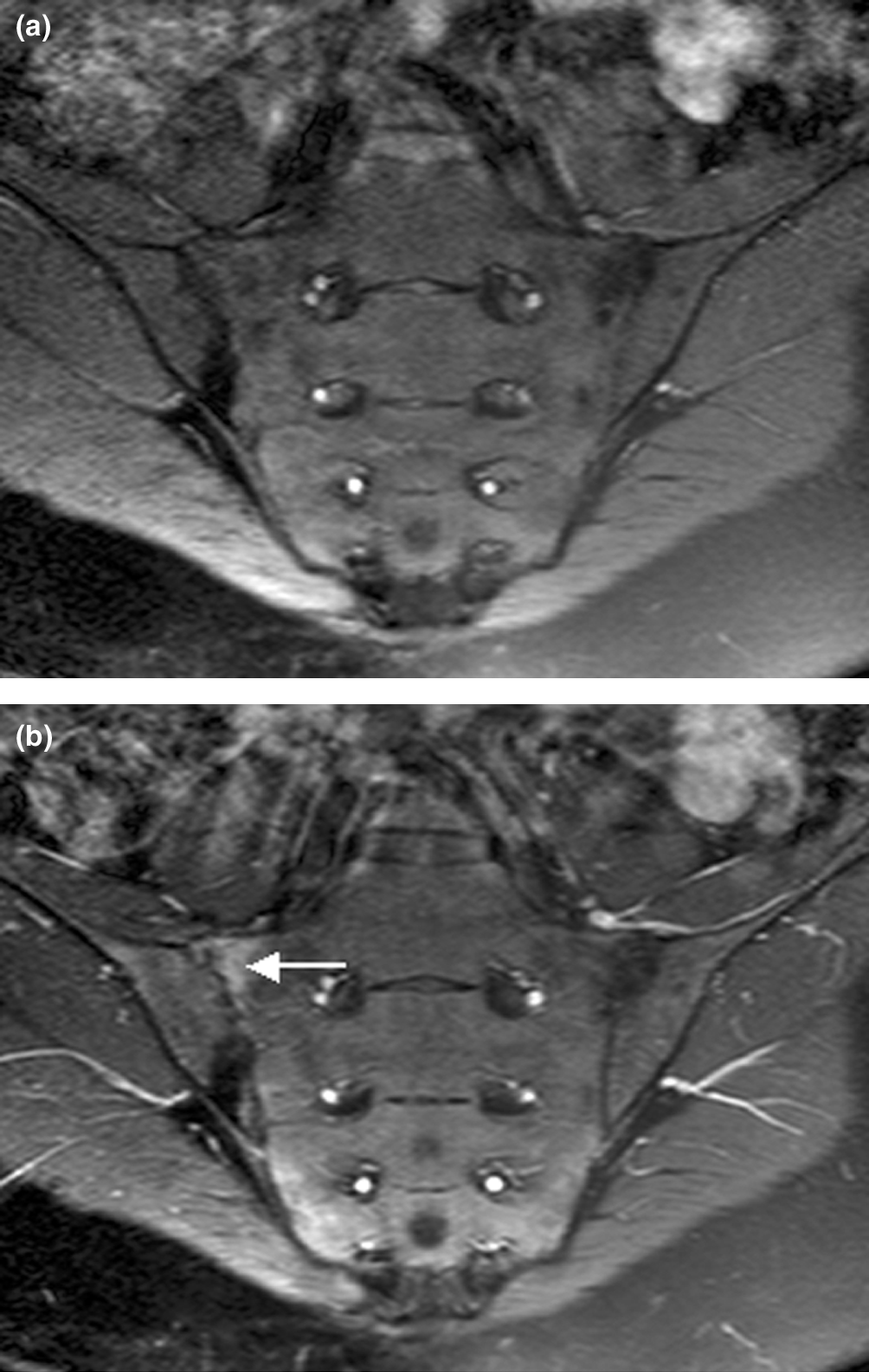
T1-weighted semi-coronal MRI of sacroiliac joints (a) before and (b) after contrast showing active sacroiliitis (arrow).

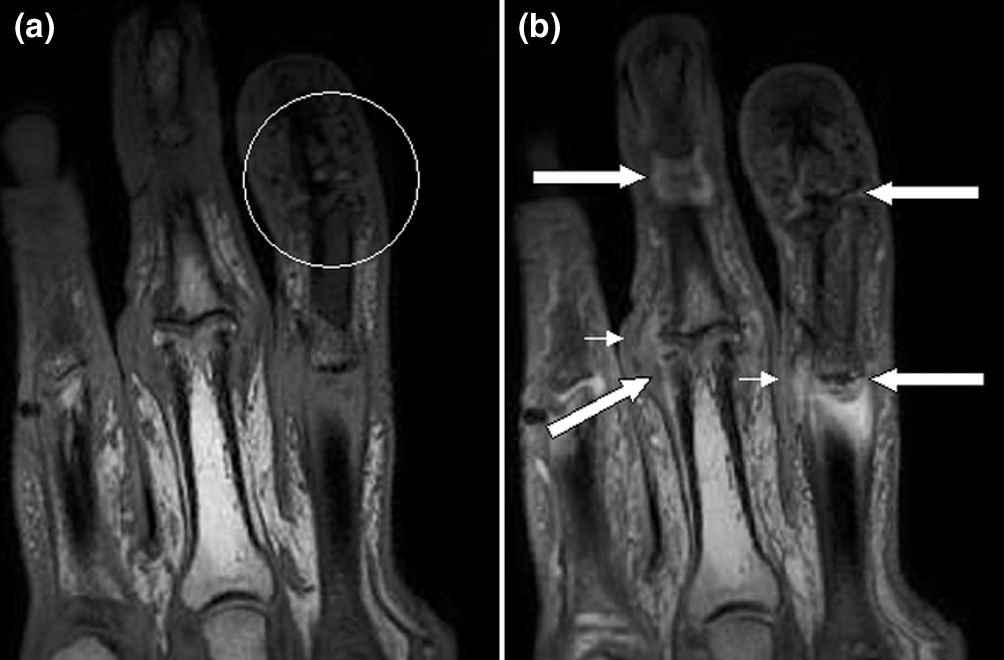
Coronal T1-weighted MRI of fingers in PsA. (a) Pre- and (b) post-contrast showing active synovitis at proximal and distal interphalangeal joints (large arrows), joint space narrowing, bone proliferation at proximal interphalangeal joint, erosions at distal interphalangeal joint (white circle), enthesitis medial to proximal interphalangeal joints.

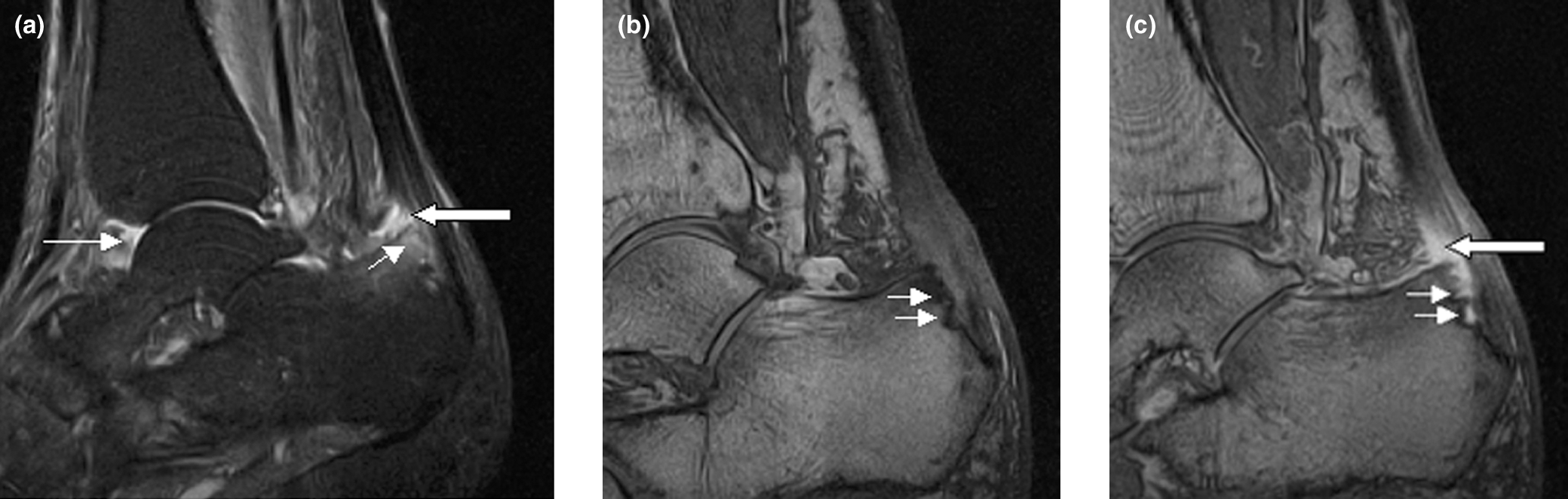
(a) STIR Sagittal MRI of ankle showing enthesitis at Achilles tendon insertion (thick arrow), synovitis of ankle joint (long thin arrow), and bone marrow edema at tendon insertion (short thin arrow). T1-weighted images, before (b) and after (c) contrast, show enthesitis (large arrow) and bone erosion at tendon insertion (short thin arrows).

=== Differential diagnosis ===
Several conditions can mimic the clinical presentation of psoriatic arthritis including rheumatoid arthritis, osteoarthritis, reactive arthritis, gouty arthritis, systemic lupus erythematosus, and inflammatory bowel disease-associated arthritis.

In contrast to psoriatic arthritis, rheumatoid arthritis tends to affect the proximal joints (e.g., the metacarpophalangeal joints), involves a greater number of joints than psoriatic arthritis, and affects them symmetrically. Involvement of the spinal joints is more suggestive of psoriatic arthritis than rheumatoid arthritis. Rheumatoid factor (RF) and cyclic citrullinated peptide autoantibodies are typically found in the blood of people with RA, but not, as a rule, in those with PsA.

Comorbidities may help differential diagnosis.

Osteoarthritis shares certain clinical features with psoriatic arthritis, such as its tendency to affect multiple distal joints in an asymmetric pattern. Unlike psoriatic arthritis, osteoarthritis does not typically involve inflammation of the sacroiliac joint.

Psoriatic arthritis sometimes affects only one joint and is sometimes confused with gout or pseudogout when this happens.

=== Classification ===
PsA itself may be classified both as a type of arthropathy (a condition affecting the joints) and as a type of spondyloarthritis / spondyloarthropathy (inflammation of the joints in the spine).

There are five main types of psoriatic arthritis:

- Oligoarticular: This type affects around 70% of patients and is generally mild. This type does not occur in the same joints on both sides of the body and usually only involves fewer than 3 joints.
- Polyarticular: This type accounts for around 25% of cases, and affects five or more joints on both sides of the body simultaneously. This type is most similar to rheumatoid arthritis and is disabling in around 50% of all cases.
- Arthritis mutilans (M07.1): Affects less than 5% of patients and is a severe, deforming, and destructive arthritis. This condition can progress over months or years, causing severe joint damage. Arthritis mutilans has also been called chronic absorptive arthritis and may be seen in rheumatoid arthritis.
- Spondyloarthritis (M07.2): This type is characterized by stiffness of the neck or the sacroiliac joint of the spine, but can also affect the hands and feet, in a similar fashion to symmetric arthritis.
- Distal interphalangeal predominant (M07.0): This type of psoriatic arthritis is found in about 5% of patients and is characterized by inflammation and stiffness in the joints nearest to the ends of the fingers and toes. Nail damage is often marked.

== Management ==
Because prolonged inflammation can lead to joint damage, early diagnosis and treatment to slow or prevent joint damage is recommended.

The underlying process in psoriatic arthritis is inflammation; therefore, treatments are directed at reducing and controlling inflammation. The first-line initial treatment for most patients is a TNF inhibitor-type biological disease-modifying anti-rheumatic drug (DMARD).

The goal of treatment is to achieve minimal or low disease activity. The criteria for minimal disease activity is meeting five of these seven criteria and low disease activity/remission is achieved when all seven criteria are fulfilled: (1) tender joint count ≤1, (2) tender entheseal joints ≤1, (3) swollen joint count ≤1, (4) PASI ≤1 or BSA ≤3%, (5) patient pain VAS ≤15, (6) patient global disease activity VAS ≤20, (7) HAQ ≤0.5.

=== Biological DMARDs ===
Biologics (also called biological response modifiers) are a class of therapeutics developed using recombinant DNA technology. Biologic medications are derived from living cells cultured in a laboratory. Unlike traditional DMARDs that affect the entire immune system, biologics target specific parts of the immune system. They are given by injection or intravenous (IV) infusion.

Biologics prescribed for psoriatic arthritis are TNF-α inhibitors, including infliximab, etanercept, golimumab, certolizumab pegol and adalimumab, as well as the IL-12/IL-23 inhibitor ustekinumab, the IL-17A inhibitor secukinumab, and the IL-23 inhibitor risankizumab.

Biologics may increase the risk of minor and serious infections. More rarely, they may be associated with nervous system disorders, blood disorders or certain types of cancer. People with psoriasis who are treated with biologics do not have a higher risk of cancer.

=== Nonsteroidal anti-inflammatory drugs ===
Typically the medications first prescribed for psoriatic arthritis are NSAIDs such as ibuprofen and naproxen, followed by more potent NSAIDs like diclofenac, indomethacin, and etodolac. NSAIDs can irritate the stomach and intestines, and long-term use can lead to gastrointestinal bleeding. Coxibs (COX-2 inhibitors) e.g. celecoxib or etoricoxib, are associated with a statistically significant 50 to 66% relative risk reduction in gastrointestinal ulcers and bleeding complications compared to traditional NSAIDs, but carry an increased rate of cardiovascular events such as myocardial infarction (MI) or heart attack, and stroke. Both COX-2 inhibitors and other non-selective NSAIDs have potential adverse effects that include damage to the kidneys.

=== Conventional synthetic disease-modifying antirheumatic drugs ===
Oral small molecules such as methotrexate, leflunomide, cyclosporin, azathioprine, and sulfasalazine are used in persistent symptomatic cases without exacerbation. Rather than just reducing pain and inflammation, this class of drugs helps slow down or halt the progression of the disease, and therefore limits the amount of joint damage that occurs. Most DMARDs act slowly and may take weeks or even months to take full effect. According to a recent Cochrane review, low-dose oral methotrexate was slightly more effective than placebos. Immunosuppressant drugs can also reduce psoriasis skin symptoms but can lead to liver and kidney problems and an increased risk of serious infection.

=== Phosphodiesterase-4 inhibitors ===
A first-in-class treatment option for the management of psoriatic arthritis is apremilast, a small molecule phosphodiesterase-4 inhibitor approved for use by the FDA in 2014. By inhibiting PDE4, an enzyme that breaks down cyclic adenosine monophosphate, cAMP levels rise, resulting in the down-regulation of various pro-inflammatory factors including TNF-α, interleukin 17 and interleukin 23, as well as the up-regulation of anti-inflammatory factor interleukin 10.

It is given in tablet form and taken by mouth. Side effects include headaches, back pain, nausea, diarrhea, fatigue, nasopharyngitis, and upper respiratory tract infections, as well as depression and weight loss.

It was patented in 2014 and manufactured by Celgene. A generic is produced by Sandoz Canada.

=== JAK inhibitors ===
The JAK1 inhibitors tofacitinib (Xeljanz) and upadacitinib (Rinvoq) are approved for the use in active psoriatic arthritis. The TYK2 inhibitor deucravacitinib (Sotyktu), which has been approved for plaque psoriasis, is currently undergoing a Phase II clinical trial to evaluate the efficacy and safety on psoriatic arthritis. The Takeda TYK2 inhibitor TAK-279 recently demonstrated a 20% improvement in signs and symptoms of disease at week 12 as compared to placebo in a Phase II clinical trial. Takeda has also initiated a Phase III, Multicenter, Randomized, trial to evaluate the efficacy and safety of TAK-279 in subjects with Moderate-to-Severe Plaque Psoriasis.

=== Other treatments ===
A review found tentative evidence of benefit of low level laser therapy and concluded that it could be considered for relief of pain and stiffness associated RA.

Photochemotherapy with methoxsalen and long-wave ultraviolet light (PUVA therapy) is used for severe skin lesions. Doctors may use joint injections with corticosteroids in cases where one joint is severely affected. In psoriatic arthritis patients with severe joint damage, orthopedic surgery may be implemented to correct joint destruction, usually with the use of a joint replacement. Surgery is effective for pain alleviation, correcting joint disfigurement, and reinforcing joint usefulness and strength.

=== Management of fatigue ===
Changes in lifestyle may help manage fatigue.

== Prognosis ==
The condition can be disabling, severely decreasing physical health. People with PsA may have reduced ability to work. Psychological health may also be decreased as a result of chronic pain, anxiety, depression, and reduced self-esteem. As a result, quality of life may also be significantly reduced. Some of the possible comorbidities (conditions which may occur together with PsA) may reduce life span.

== Epidemiology ==
A 2024 systematic review reported the global prevalence of adults with PsA as 0.112% (112 per 100,000 adults). Reported prevalence ranges from 0.1 to 1% of the general population. The reason for the wide variation is possibly related to different genetics, environmental factors such as lifestyle and diet, and the methods used in the research (e.g., definition and method of detection). The disease is more common in some populations. In Europe, the prevalence is 0.188% (188 per 100,000), 0.048% (48 per 100,000) in Asia, 0.133% (133 per 100,000) in North America, and 0.017% (17 per 100,000) in South America. Other studies found an overall prevalence rate of 0.1–0.2%, and an incidence rate of 0.006% annually. Males and females are affected in equal proportion. The peak incidence (number of new cases) happens between the ages of 30 and 60.

70% of people who develop psoriatic arthritis first show signs of psoriasis on the skin, 15% develop skin psoriasis and arthritis at the same time, and 15% develop skin psoriasis following the onset of psoriatic arthritis. Some people with PsA never get psoriasis.

Psoriatic arthritis can develop in people who have any level of severity of psoriatic skin disease, ranging from mild to very severe. Studies have found that obesity is a significant risk factor and predictor of disease outcome. Other risk factors associated with an increased risk of developing psoriatic arthritis include severe psoriasis, nail psoriasis, scalp psoriasis, inverse psoriasis, and having a first-degree relative with psoriatic arthritis.

Psoriatic arthritis tends to appear about 10 years after the first signs of psoriasis. For the majority of people, this is between the ages of 30 and 55, but the disease can also affect children. The onset of psoriatic arthritis symptoms before symptoms of skin psoriasis is more common in children than in adults.

More than 80% of patients with psoriatic arthritis will have psoriatic nail lesions characterized by nail pitting, separation of the nail from the underlying nail bed, ridging and cracking, or, more severely, loss of the nail itself (onycholysis).

Men and women are equally affected by this condition. Like psoriasis, psoriatic arthritis is more common among Caucasians than African or Asian people.

== Prevention ==
Some progress has been made in preventing patients with psoriasis from developing psoriatic arthritis. However, once psoriatic arthritis is established, the inflammatory burden of psoriatic disease might not be susceptible to modulation in many patients.
