= HLA-B16 =

Human leukocyte antigen serotype

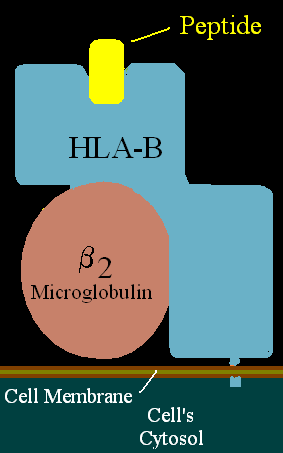
illustration of HLA-B with bound peptide

HLA-B16 (B16) is an HLA - B serotype. B16 is a broad antigen serotype that recognizes the B38 and B39 split antigen serotypes.
