= HLA-B38 =

Human leukocyte antigen serotype

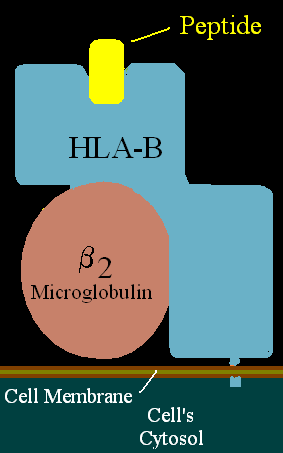
HLA-B (alpha)-β2MG with bound peptide
major histocompatibility complex (human), class I, B38
Alleles	B*3801, 3802, . .
Structure (See HLA-B)
Shared data
Locus	chr.6 6p21.31

HLA-B38 (B38) is an HLA-B serotype. The serotype identifies the B*38 allele products of the HLA-B gene-locus.

B38 is a split antigen of the broad antigen B16, and is a sister type of B39. The B*3801 allele is more common in Eastern, Southern and Southeastern Europe, while the B*3802 allele is more common in the Far East.

== Serotype ==
Serotypes B38, B16, and B39 recognition of the HLA B*39 gene products
B*38	B38	B16	B39	Sample
allele	%	%	%	size (N)
*3801	94	1	1	2317
*3802	87	2	2	788
Alleles link-out to IMGT/HLA Databease at EBI

== Alleles ==
HLA B*3801 frequencies
		freq
ref.	Population	(%)
	Israel Ashk. and Non Ashk. Jews	6.9
	Croatia	6.7
	Italy North	6.7
	Azores Central Islands	5.4
	Sudanese	5.3
	Czech Republic	4.7
	Georgia Tbilisi Georgians	4.6
	Macedonia (4)	4.6
	Spain Eastern Andalusia	4.1
	Georgia Svaneti Svans	3.8
	New Mexico Canoncito Navajo	3.7
	Bulgaria	3.6
	Brazil Belo Horizonte	3.2
	Romanian	3.2
	Tunisia	3.0
	Thailand	2.8
	Israel Arab Druse	2.5
	USA Caucasian (2)	2.5
	Tunisia Tunis	2.3
	Brazil	2.2
	Indig. Australian Cape York Penin.	2.0
	France South East	1.9
	Georgia Tbilisi Kurds	1.7
	Australia New South Wales	1.5
	China Guangzhou	1.5
	Mexico Guadalajara Mestizos (2)	1.5
	China Yunnan Lisu	1.4
	Jordan Amman	1.4
	Morocco Nador Metalsa Class I	1.4
	China South Han	1.2
	Mexico Mestizos	1.2
	Saudi Arabia Guraiat and Hail	1.2
	Finland	1.1
	USA North American Natives	1.1
	American Samoa	1.0
	China North Han	1.0
	India North Hindus	1.0
	Mexico Mixtec Oaxaca	1.0
	Hong Kong Chinese	0.9
	Ireland Northern	0.9
	Cape Verde Southeastern Islands	0.8
	China Beijing	0.8
	Ireland South	0.8

== Disease ==
A higher frequency of HLA-B38 was noted psoriatic arthritis patients with erythroderma. Psoriatic arthritis is linked to MICA and/or B39 in other peoples. In Pemphigus vulgaris a haplotype containing B38 was identified and found to be shared between Spanish and Jewish patients. Linkage studies indicate a factor in the HLA-class I region is more greatly associated, with HLA-B38 so far the only linked allele

HLA B*3802 frequencies
		freq
ref.	Population	(%)
	Taiwan Tao	11.0
	China Guangxi Maonan	8.3
	China South Han	7.1
	Singapore Javan. Indonesians	7.1
	Singapore Chinese Han	6.4
	Taiwan Minnan pop 1	6.4
	China Guangzhou	6.0
	Philippines Ivatan	6.0
	Hong Kong Chinese	5.4
	Singapore Chinese	4.7
	Singapore Riau Malay	4.5
	China Guangzhou Han	4.3
	India West Bhils	4.0
	Taiwan Hakka	3.6
	Singapore Thai	3.5
	Taiwan Siraya	2.9
	Taiwan Pazeh	1.8
	India Mumbai Marathas	1.2
	South Korea pop 3	1.1
	Taiwan Puyuma	1.0
	Taiwan Saisiat	1.0
	China Beijing	0.8
	Brazil	0.7
