= HLA-B39 =

Human leukocyte antigen serotype

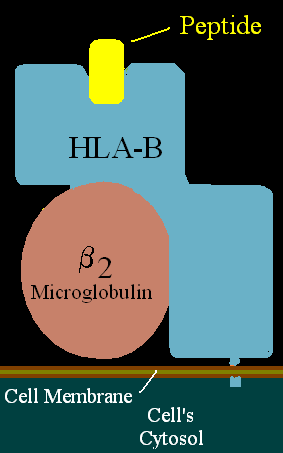
HLA-B (alpha)-β2MG with bound peptide
major histocompatibility complex (human), class I, B39
Alleles	B*3901, 3902, 3903, . .
Structure (See HLA-B)
Shared data
Locus	chr.6 6p21.31

HLA-B39 (B39) is an HLA-B serotype. The serotype identifies the more common HLA-B*39 gene products.

B39 is a split antigen of the broad antigen B16, and is a sister type of B38. B39 is most commonly found on the west pacific rim, in Japan and highest frequency in the new world. In Europe it is found in Scandinavia and Northern Russia.

== Serotype ==
Serotypes B39, B16, and B38 recognition of the HLA B*39 gene products
B*39	B39	B16	B38	Sample
allele	%	%	%	size (N)
*3901	95			476
*3902	87			96
*3903	77			20
*3905	82			245
*3906	94			508
*3908	48			57
*3909	97			13
*3910	82			127
*3911	69			16
Alleles link-out to IMGT/HLA Databease at EBI

The serology for the most common B39 alleles, B*3901 and B*3906 is good, but some allele products are not well detected. Given the differential involvement of these alleles in disease testing should involve high resolution typing.

HLA B*3906 frequencies
		freq
ref.	Population	(%)
	Venezuela Perja Mountain Bari	23.9
	Mexico Mixtec Oaxaca	8.8
	USA Arizona Pima	7.3
	USA South Texas Hispanics	5.6
	Mexico Zaptotec Oaxaca	4.5
	New Mexico Canoncito Navajo	3.7
	Oman	2.5
	PNG Wanigela	2.3
	Tunisia Tunis	2.3
	North American Natives	1.9
	USA Hispanic	1.7
	Brazil Belo Horizonte	1.6
	South Dakota Lakota Sioux	1.5
	Cuban White	1.4
	Azores S. Maria & S. Miguel	1.3
	Australia New South Wales	1.1
	Finland	1.1
	Portugal North	1.1
	Portugal Centre	1.0
	Spain Eastern Andalusia Gipsy	1.0
	Brazil Terena	0.9
	Ireland Northern	0.9
	Azores Terceira Island	0.8
	USA Caucasian pop2	0.8
	Brazil	0.7
	USA Philadelphia Caucasians	0.7
	India Andhra Pradesh Golla	0.5
	Thailand	0.4

== Alleles ==
HLA B*3901 frequencies
		freq
ref.	Population	(%)
	Taiwan Saisiat	54.9
	Taiwan Tsou	24.5
	South Dakota Lakota Sioux	22.5
	Taiwan Taroko	21.8
	Taiwan Atayal	19.8
	PNG Wanigela	16.7
	Japan Ainu Hokkaido	16.0
	Taiwan Bunun	14.9
	New Mexico Canoncito Navajo	14.6
	Taiwan Thao	13.3
	Taiwan Rukai	13.0
	Taiwan Ami	10.2
	USA Hawaii Okinawa	7.7
	Papua New Guinea Wosera	7.0
	Papua New Guinea Madang	6.4
	Mexico Mixtec Oaxaca	5.9
	Taiwan Puyuma	5.0
	Taiwan Paiwan	4.9
	New Caledonia	4.8
	Japan Central	4.4
	American Samoa	4.0
	USA North American Natives	4.0
	Taiwan Hakka	3.6
	Indig. Australian Cape York Peninsula	3.5
	Japan (5)	3.5
	Philippines Ivatan	3.0
	Brazil	2.9
	China Guangxi Maonan	2.8
	Georgia Tbilisi Georgians	2.8
	China Yunnan Nu	2.6
	Thailand	2.5
	Azores Terceira Island	2.4
	Singapore Chinese	2.4
	Romanian	2.3
	China Yunnan Lisu	2.2
	Indig. Australian Yuendumu	2.1
	China Guangzhou	2.0
	Croatia	2.0
	France South East	1.9
	Georgia Svaneti Svans	1.9
	PNG Karimui Plateau	1.9
	Azores Central Islands	1.8
	Spain Eastern Andalusia	1.8
	Uganda Kampala	1.6
	Mexico Zaptotec Oaxaca	1.5
	Singapore Thai	1.5
	China Guangzhou Han	1.4
	China Qinghai Hui	1.4
	Czech Republic	1.4
	Madeira	1.4
	Indig. Australian Kimberly	1.3
	Finland	1.1

== Disease ==
B39 is suggested as a factor in Takayasu's arteritis and gallstones in Mexico. Osteoarticular complications of brucellosis appear to be associated with B39. An association with spondylarthropathies and psoriatic arthritis was observed in several studies. Psoriatic arthritis appears to be linked to MICA-A9 which tightly linked to HLA-B39. B39 also appears to be involved in the Fishers syndrome variant of Guillain–Barré syndrome.

B39 appears to be protective against cardiomyopathy in Chaga's disease indicating a possible selective factor in its rise in the New World. Chaga's disease is caused by a trypanosome carried by a blood sucking insect found in tropical, palm growing regions.

Southern California now reports cases of Chaga's disease from contaminated transfusions and may be already a habitat for the vector.

=== In Takayasu's arteritis ===
Takayasu's arteritis appears to have a link to B39. The association with B*3902 increases risk of pulmonary infarction, ischemic heart disease, aortic regurgitation, systemic hypertension, renal artery stenosis, cerebrovascular disease, and visual disturbance. B*3906, common in indigenous Mesoamericans has been found associated with the same disease.

HLA B*3902 frequencies
		freq
ref.	Population	(%)
	Mexico Mixe Oaxaca	38.7
	Mexico Zaptotec Oaxaca	13.4
	Mexico Mixtec Oaxaca	5.9
	Mexico Mestizos	1.2
	Japan pop5	0.9
	Cuban White	0.7
	Israel Ashk. and Non Ashk. Jews	0.5
	Japan Central	0.5
	Senegal Niokholo Mandenka	0.5
B*3903
	PNG New Britain Rabaul	13.2
	Brazil Terena	11.2
	Argentina Toba Rosario	5.2
	Brazil	0.7
	Finland	0.6
	Kenya Luo	0.6
	North American Natives	0.5
B*3904
	Argentina Toba Rosario	1.2
	Georgia Svaneti Svans	0.6
	Jordan Amman	0.3
	Shijiazhuang Tianjian Han	0.1
	Japan Central	0.1
	Romanian	0.1
B*3905
	Venezuela Perija Yucpa	36.1
	Mexico Zaptotec Oaxaca	12.7
	Mexico Mixtec Oaxaca	9.8
	Mexico Mestizos	4.9
	Arizona Pima	4.5
	Mexico Guadalajara Mestizos	2.4
	Argentina Toba Rosario	2.3
	USA Hispanic	2.1
	Mexico Mixe Oaxaca	1.9
	Cuban White	1.4
	Mexico Chihuahua Tarahumara	1.1
	USA North American Natives	0.5
	Shijiazhuang Tianjian Han	0.2
B*3907
	Shijiazhuang Tianjian Han	0.6
	Singapore Thai	0.5
	China South Han	0.2
B*3908
	Mexico Zaptotec Oaxaca	2.2
	Mexico Mestizos	1.2
	Mexico Mixtec Oaxaca	1.0
	Brazil	0.7
	USA Hispanic	0.6
B*3909
	Venezuela Perija Yucpa	34.9
	Thailand pop3	3.1
	Brazil Terena	1.7
	China South Han	1.4
	Argentina Toba Rosario	1.2
	China Qinghai Hui	0.9
B*3910
	Sudanese	2.5
	Senegal Niokholo Mandenka	2.1
	South African Natal Zulu	1.5
	Cameroon Beti	1.4
	Spain Eastern Andalusia	1.2
	Kenya Luo	1.1
	Israel Arab Druse	1.0
	Kenya Nandi	1.0
	Guinea Bissau	0.8
	Kenya	0.7
	Mali Bandiagara	0.7
	Morocco Nador Metalsa Class I	0.7
	Cameroon Bamileke	0.6
	Cameroon Yaounde	0.5
	Israel Ashk. and Non Ashk. Jews	0.5
	Saudi Arabia Guraiat and Hail	0.5
