= Keratinocyte carcinoma =

Keratinocyte carcinomas (also termed keratinocyte cancers) are a group of nonmelanoma skin cancers arising from the keratinocyte found in the epidermis of the human skin, namely:

- Basal-cell carcinoma (BCC)
- Cutaneous squamous-cell carcinoma (cSCC)
- Cutaneous squamous-cell carcinoma in situ or Bowen's disease (cSCC in situ)
