= Derek McMinn =

British orthopaedic surgeon and inventor

Derek McMinn M.D. F.R.C.S.
- Occupation: Orthopaedic Surgeon
- Known for: Hip Resurfacing, Total Hip Replacement, Hip Revision Surgery, Total Knee Replacement, Knee Revision Surgery

"Professor" Derek McMinn is a British orthopaedic surgeon and inventor who practised in Birmingham, United Kingdom.

McMinn developed one of the successful modern metal-on-metal hip resurfacing and the instrumentation and surgical technique to implant it. Hip resurfacing is a bone-conserving, less invasive alternative to total hip replacement (THR) for young patients, markedly improves the health-related quality of life measures and currently makes up around a twentieth of all hip arthroplasty (artificial joint) procedures performed in the United Kingdom. McMinn is also the inventor of several other prostheses for the hip and knee.

Derek McMinn is the author of Modern Hip Resurfacing (ISBN 978-1848000872), published in 2009.

== Hip resurfacing ==
=== Birmingham Hip Resurfacing ===
McMinn first began performing hip resurfacing procedures in 1991 using the McMinn Resurfacing, manufactured by Corin. The rationale behind the procedure was that it would be a bone-conserving alternative to THR for patients with higher activity demands i.e. young patients with severe hip arthritis who are otherwise in good health. This would buy time until they reached an age at which they would be more suitable for a THR. THRs use small diameter metal-on-polyethylene bearings which have a high rate of dislocation and revision in this group of patients.

Sir John Charnley originally developed the conventional THR in the 1950s, which proved to be one of the most successful operations in the world. In this procedure the 'ball' part of the hip joint (femoral head) and a portion of its neck are removed and the 'socket' part (acetabulum) is grated in preparation. These are replaced with an artificial ball and socket with a long stem in the thigh bone. This and other designs of THRs have since transformed the quality of life of millions of old patients with severe hip arthritis. Because these devices contained polyethylene as one of the rubbing surfaces, Charnley was wary of using it in young patients. He warned against the use of a THR in any young patient unless there were other physical restraining factors which would stop the patient from getting back to high activity levels. True to his prediction when these THRs were used in young patients they failed early even in the best centres on the world, including Charnley's own centre at Wrightington Hospital in the UK. The Swedish Hip Register shows that in young patients, 19% of THRs failed 10 years after the operation and 67% had failed by 16 years. Because these patients are young, early failure implies the need for repeated revision operations using progressively more invasive and more complex devices. It was therefore always attractive to surgeons to employ a bone conserving procedure in young patients initially. When they need a revision there is more useful bone preserved to fix the new device to.

The Corin technique of resurfacing employs thin (3–4 mm) metal surfaces to line the patients' own hip. In contrast to a THR, the femoral head and neck are retained in this procedure. These large diameter resurfacings match the patient's own anatomy. Because they do not contain polyethylene, these bearings wear at a much lower rate, provided they are manufactured according to specifications, and are implanted well. These allow the patients to return to higher levels of activity after the operation without the fear of early wear. Furthermore, because the devices have the same diameter as the patients' own, they are less prone to dislocation.

Over the following years, McMinn further improved the design and operative technique, eventually developing the Birmingham Hip Resurfacing (BHR). The first BHR was implanted in July 1997, in Birmingham, England. Over the next few years its success spurred surgeons all over the United Kingdom, Europe, Australia and many parts of Asia to start performing the procedure. On 9 May 2006, the FDA approved the BHR for medical use in the United States. Following thirteen years of usage McMinn reports 96% success with his BHRs in all patients and all diagnoses. These resurfacings are particularly successful in young patients who are the worst group for THRs. His success rate of the BHR in this age group is 98% at 13 years. Several other series and national registers also show similar results of around 95% currently with the BHR. The 2009 Australian National Joint Replacement Registry reported a 95% success rate for the BHR.

From 2009 onwards MOM resurfacing came under a cloud, as DePuy marketed the ASR hip resurfacing and persuaded many of their user surgeons to implant it. It had a bearing clearance of 60 microns, in comparison with the BHR's 200+ microns, determined from the Ring explant and other retrievals. With a high early failure rate it was taken off the market within 3 years. More careful surveillance by the UK National Joint Registry indicated that resurfacings in women had a higher failure rate, as any head size of 46mm and less had.

In 2004 John O'Hara worked with Finsbury Orthopaedics to develop the ADEPT hip resurfacing. The implant was very similar and was manufactured on the same machines as the BHR has been since 1997. The major developments were in the instrumentation which were so improved that it became much easier to implant the Adept in an optimal position.

In the most recent UKNJR data, the failure rate for the Adept is slightly better than ceramic on cross linked polyethylene hip replacements and is half that of the BHR in the range of sizes still made.

== Short stem hip replacement ==
=== Birmingham Mid Head Resection ===
In the early 2000s, McMinn found that the results of the BHR are excellent in all types of hip arthritis except one. In a condition called osteonecrosis, in which the ball part of the hip joint suffers a loss of blood supply and becomes non-viable, the results of hip resurfacing are not good (less than 90% success 10 years after their operation). Osteonecrosis can occur from a variety of reasons including fracture of the femoral neck, or patients who received high dose steroids due to any medical condition or those suffering from alcohol abuse. In such patients the quality of bone in the femoral head (the ball part of the hip) is compromised and progressively crunches leading to a failure of resurfacing. For such patients with poor quality femoral head bone stock, who are unsuitable for a regular hip resurfacing, McMinn developed a conservative and more versatile metal-on-metal arthroplasty, the Birmingham Mid Head Resection (BMHR) device. The BMHR is demonstrating good medium term results in such high risk patients.

== Total knee replacement ==
=== Birmingham Knee Replacement ===
Derek McMinn describes himself as primarily a knee surgeon who digressed into hip surgery for a few years in the past couple of decades. His colleagues acknowledge him as one of the finest knee surgeons in the world. In addition to performing many complex primary and revision knee operations in the past three decades, he also designed and developed a revision total knee replacement (TKR) for extensive bone loss in the mid 1990s.

Current evidence shows that although knee replacements survive almost as long as hip replacements, the outcome of available designs of knee replacements are not as good as hip replacements. While only 1–5% of patients with a THR or a hip resurfacing are unhappy with their outcomes in the early years, nearly 20% of patients who undergo a knee replacement are dissatisfied with their outcome. In an attempt to improve the functional outcome following knee replacements McMinn developed a high performance knee which closely mimics the movement, stability and function of the natural knee to a greater extent. The world-class laboratory where the BKR was bench-tested reported that of all the artificial knees tested thus far, the BKR generated the least volume of wear. Early outcomes with the Birmingham Knee Replacement (BKR) are very promising. Of course only time will tell if the long-term satisfaction of patients with BKRs match those with hip resurfacings.

== Career ==
Derek McMinn went to Royal School Dungannon, Northern Ireland where he captained the 1st XV rugby team and represented Ulster Schools XV. He qualified from St Thomas' Hospital Medical school in London in 1977, having captained the 1st XV rugby team and won the Cheselden medal and 1st prize in surgery. He has practised as a Consultant Orthopaedic Surgeon since 1988.

McMinn personally trains surgeons from around the world in operative techniques. He is frequently invited to lecture at academic conferences around the world. He was given the honour of delivering the Presidential Guest Lecture at the Hip Society Open Meeting during the 75th Anniversary Meeting of the American Academy of Orthopaedic Surgeons in San Francisco in 2008.

McMinn was also invited to deliver the 2008 Sir John Charnley Lecture at the British Orthopaedic Association and the 2008 Sir Robert Jones Lecture at the New York University Hospital for Joint Diseases in New York City, US. In addition he has delivered guest lectures at conferences in various countries from Japan to Australia to the Asia Pacific Orthopaedic Association, the European Federation of Orthopaedic Societies, the American Academy, the Argentinian Orthopaedic Association etc. He has addressed the Select Committee of the House of Commons in the United Kingdom apprising the members of parliament and senior civil servants of recent developments and strategies of healthcare as it applies to orthopaedics.

McMinn has published extensively on the topic of hip arthritis and several other related orthopaedic topics. Recently he released a book entitled Modern Hip Resurfacing, which covers the development of resurfacing; and describes in detail all the nuances of the operative technique, in addition to being a treatise on the whole subject of resurfacing and its effects.

In 2009, in recognition of his contribution to the medical profession, McMinn was awarded the degree of Doctor of Medicine (MD) Honoris Causa by the University of Birmingham.

== Human tissue investigation ==
In March 2019 a routine pathology audit in Edgbaston Hospital discovered 20 pots of bones dating back to December 2018 in a storage area. Senior managers arranged for staff to take the samples to the McMinn Centre nearby. An internal BMI Healthcare report found McMinn had no approval for research, which is required by the Human Tissue Act when storing patient samples, nor had he carried out research on the material. The hospital's executive director contacted McMinn in July 2019, letting him know that the hospital did not have a licence to store human tissue.

The Care Quality Commission inspected the hospital in March 2019 and learned of the sample pots. They asked the hospital if it had a license from the Human Tissue Authority, or if McMinn had acquired consent from the patients. McMinn explained in August 2019, that he had stored the samples for research and had been doing so for 25 years. He claimed he had acquired verbal consent from patients, and that he had an additional several thousand tissue samples. These samples had been stored in his Worcestershire farmhouse and a premises in Birmingham.

McMinn was suspended in late March 2019 by BMI Healthcare, who shared the details of the incident with the General Medical Council and Human Tissue Authority. The Human Tissue Authority then referred the case to the police. On 30 September 2020 BMI Healthcare launched a helpline for his patients, listing the number on their website. The case was also referred to the Information Commissioner's Office.

In October 2020, the GMC imposed interim conditions imposed on his license to practise while they continued their investigation. The requirements included needing to inform the GMC where he worked, and needing to ask the GMC for advice before starting any role. In July 2023 Circle Health Group, who acquired Edgbaston Hospital when they took over BMI Healthcare, plead guilty to illegally storing human tissues without a Human Tissue Authority licence. The company was subsequently issued with a £100,000 fine for the offence.

McMinn was not charged in relation to the storage of human tissues. As of March 2025, he no longer has a license to practice within the UK, having relinquished it.
