= Abducted =

Abducted may refer to:

== Film and television ==
- Abducted (2013 film), directed by Glen Scantlebury & Lucy Phillips
- "Abducted" (Invader Zim), an episode of animated television series Invader Zim
- Abducted: The Carlina White Story, a 2012 American film
- "The Abducted", a 2010 episode of television series Fringe
- Abducted, an alternative title for the 2012 tele-movie Layover with Lauren Holly
- Abducted, a 2020 American film with Scout Taylor-Compton

== Music ==
- Abducted, a 1996 album by Hypocrisy
- "Abducted", a song by Cults from their 2011 album Cults

== See also ==
- Abduction (disambiguation)
- Abductor (disambiguation)
