= Abductor =

Abductor may refer to:

- Abductor, someone performing a kidnapping (abduction)
- Abductor muscle (disambiguation), a muscle which draws a limb away from the median plane of the body
- Abductor wedge, a medical device that separates the legs of a patient
- The Abductors, a 1957 film directed by Andrew McLaglen

== See also ==
- Abduction (disambiguation)
