= Hip resurfacing =

- BHR compared with THR
- Specialty: Orthopedic surgery
- ICD-9-CM: 00.85-00.86

Hip resurfacing is a surgical alternative to total hip replacement (THR). The procedure consists of placing a cap (usually made of cobalt-chrome metal), which is hollow and shaped similarly to the cap of a mushroom, over the head of the femur while a matching metal cup (similar to what is used with a THR) is placed in the acetabulum (pelvis socket), replacing the articulating surfaces of the person's hip joint and removing very little bone compared to a THR. When the person moves the hip, the movement of the joint induces synovial fluid to flow between the hard metal bearing surfaces lubricating them when the components are placed in the correct position. The surgeon's level of experience with hip resurfacing is most important; therefore, the selection of the right surgeon is crucial for a successful outcome. Health-related quality of life measures are markedly improved and the person's satisfaction is favorable after hip resurfacing arthroplasty.

== Uses ==
A person's suitability for hip resurfacing is decided by the person's anatomy and the surgeon. Hip resurfacing is generally more suitable for younger people who are not morbidly obese, are clinically qualified for a hip replacement (determined by the doctor), have been diagnosed with noninflammatory degenerative joint disease, do not have an infection, and are not allergic to the metals used in the implant.

The potential advantages of hip resurfacing compared to THR include less bone removal (bone preservation), a reduced chance of hip dislocation due to a relatively larger femoral head size (given that the person has an anatomically correct femoral head size), and easier revision surgery for any subsequent revision to a THR device because a surgeon will have more original bone stock available. Hip resurfacing has the potential of being a solution for life, allows a normal ROM (range of movement) and minimizes the amount of "stress shielding", compared with THR. Since the femoral neck is retained and the femoral cavity with its marrow not opened up two other advantages exist, namely no risk of blood clots by fatty marrow that can enter the blood stream with the THR procedure and no risk of introducing bacteria in the opened femoral canal resulting in a deep infection as can happen with the THR procedure. The potential disadvantages of hip resurfacing are femoral neck fractures (rate of 0–4%), aseptic loosening, and metal wear. Due to the retention of the person's complete femoral neck other advantages exist: Surgeon induced discrepancies in leg length (as could happen with THR) are now minimized. Also, the toe-in or toe-out faults that could occur interoperatively with THR are now over because the femoral neck that determines foot direction is left undisturbed with hip resurfacing.

On February 10, 2011, the U.S. FDA issued a patient advisory on metal-metal hip implants, stating it was continuing to gather and review all available information about metal-on-metal hip systems. On June 27–28, 2012, an advisory panel met to decide whether to impose new standards. No new standards, such as routine checking of blood metal ion levels, were set, but guidance was updated.

According to the Australian Orthopaedic Associate National Joint Replacement Registry (AOANJRR) 2018 Annual Report, hip (total) resurfacing is overwhelmingly used for males (98% of total resurfacing hip replacement were males), and has declined in popularity since the mid-2000s (the number of total resurfacing procedures in 2017 was 78.7% less than 2005).

In 2006, the United States FDA approved hip resurfacing using the Birmingham Hip Resurfacing (BHR) system, designed by British Orthopaedic surgeon Derek McMinn. All other FDA approved devices have been removed from the US Market. The BHR is no longer suggested for use in women. There are several other manufacturers of hip resurfacing systems, mainly in Europe.

== Contra-indications ==
Hip resurfacing should not be used on people who have severe bone loss in their femoral head, those with large femoral neck cysts present (typically found at surgery) or cysts that are close to the head neck junction, or people who have poor bone stock or osteoporosis. Caution should be used for people who have rheumatoid arthritis, are tall, thin, or small boned, those with osteonecrosis (poor blood supply) to the femoral head, or those with femoral head cysts > 1 cm on an x-ray taken before surgery.

Metal-on-metal resurfacing systems are generally unsuitable for women of child-bearing age due to unknown effects of metal ion release on the fetus. There are hip resurfacing components that have a ceramic coating on metal femoral head component and cross linked polyethylene plastic as a liner for the socket or cup area making it not metal on metal. The plastic sleeve can be replaced if needed without removing the main components.

== Technique ==
The hip resurfacing devices are metal-on-metal articulating devices which differ from total hip replacement devices because they are more bone conserving and retain the natural geometry (so-called large ball THR devices share this trait). A THR requires that the upper portion of the femur bone be cut off to accept the stem portion of a THR device. The femur cap of the hip resurfacing devices does not require the femur bone be cut off; instead the top of the femoral head is shaped to closely fit the underside of the cap. Both hip resurfacing and hip replacement require that a cup is placed in the acetabulum of the hip socket. The main advantage of the hip resurfacing surgery is that when a revision is required, there is still an intact femur bone left for a THR stem. When a THR stem requires a revision, the metal stem in the femur has to be removed and often more bone is lost in the process of removal and replacement with a larger diameter stem. Having a hip resurfacing at a younger age means that a revision will likely be easier to perform when required.

Recent studies have shown that the outcome of a hip resurfacing is dependent on surgeon experience and that proper positioning of hip resurfacing components is crucial. Therefore, in addition to ensuring that a proven device is used, care should be taken in selecting a surgeon with experience and a good track record.

Although formal labeling restrictions exist in some countries, including the United States, hip resurfacing may allow younger, active people to return to many activities they enjoyed prior to their hip problems, which is an advantage over a traditional hip arthroplasty. The large size cap and cup of the hip resurfacing devices are the same size as a person's original ball and socket and thus are less prone to dislocation.

An often forgotten but very important advantage of hip resurfacing and thereby the retention of the femoral neck is the fact that hip resurfacing has the least measurable amount of "stress shielding" when compared to any type of THR. This means that with hip resurfacing the femur's upper portion fully retains its natural mechanical characteristics under load, also ensuring less disturbance of the processes that take place inside bone that is alive.

== Short-Term Outcomes ==
Hip resurfacing outcomes vary depending on surgical technique and surgeon experience. Total Hip Resurfacing (THR) patients face an increased risk of fractures and dislocations after surgery. In particular, femoral neck fractures are most common in the immediate post-operative period. Other complications include component loosening from substantial activity post-op that place greater stress on implants. Additionally, THR faces higher complication rates during the surgical learning curve.

== Long-Term Outcomes ==
Long-term THR outcomes are generally favorable particularly in younger, active male patients due to lower revision rates in this population. Outcomes are largely dependent on patient selection, with best results observed in individuals with good bone quality. Studies with comprised ≥10–15 year follow-up report sustained improvements in pain (measured using visual analog scale, VAS), function (modified Harris Hip Score, mHHS; HOOS-JR), and activity levels (UCLA activity score). Reported outcomes indicate consistent pain relief and satisfactory functional performance over time along with high implant survivorship (defined as time from initial procedure to revision surgery). Biomechanical advantages include improved joint stability and a closer replication of native hip anatomy.

Potential long-term outcomes include adverse reactions to metal debris (ARMD). An increased wear of metal-on-metal components are associated with a higher risk of ARMD-related failure. However, the severity of tissue damage at revision surgeries did not consistently correlate with the amount of implant wear. Continued long-term follow-up is necessary to evaluate trends in revision rates and long-term effects of metal-related complications.

== History ==
Hip Resurfacing has a long history paralleling the advances of THR. Similar designs appear to have begun in the 1940s, with the first prostheses and procedures (called double-cup arthroplasty) using congruent femoral and acetabular components emerging in the 1970s. These early designs used metal-on-polyethylene bearings, and had poor results compared to THR at the time. It has since been observed that these poor results were strongly tied with polyethylene wear debris associated with the use of air-sterilised ultra high molecular weight polyethylene (UHMWPE) at the time.

A more modern style of Hip Resurfacing emerged in the 1990s, using cobalt-chrome bearings. Clinical results using these material choice were good, prompting the popularity of resurfacing procedures to rise into the early 2000s.

Starting around 2008, a body of research was conducted around metal-on-metal bearings in general and questioning their value, finding (for instance) failures associated with metal ions due to fretting and corrosion. In 2010, the ASR device (produced by DePuy, also a metal-on-metal resurfacing implant) was recalled, and resulted in many cases of litigation.

It has been suggested that research in the area at the time focused on metal-on-metal bearings “as a class” and insufficiently distinguished the role of prosthesis design and surgical technique. Therefore, the current state of hip-resurfacing is an ongoing debate over material choice, implant design and surgical technique.

== See also ==
- Femoral neck targeting
- Minimally invasive hip resurfacing
- Total Hip Replacement
- Andy Murray
