= Hip replacement =

Surgery replacing hip joint with prosthetic implant

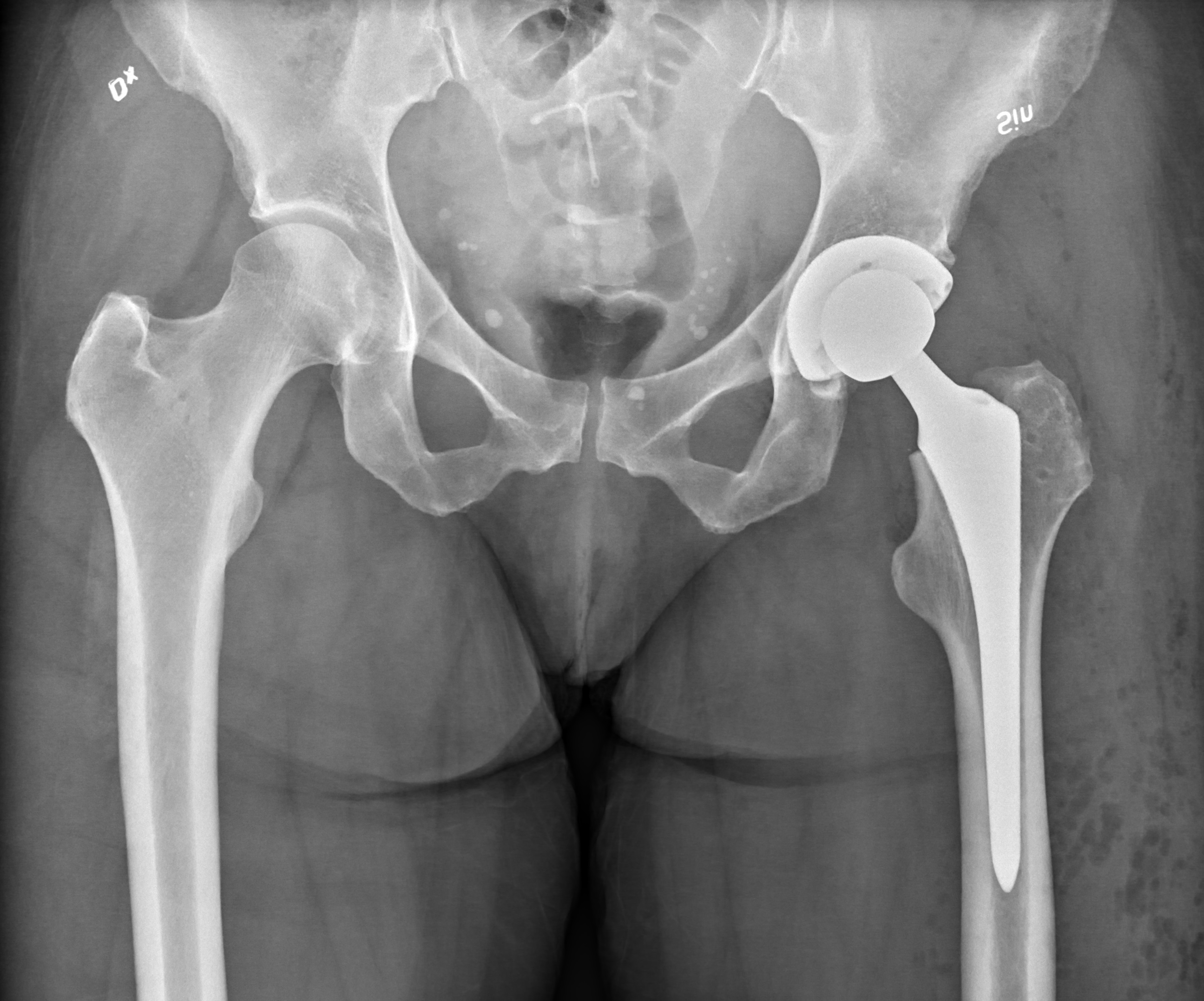
- An X-ray showing a left hip (right of image) that has been replaced, with the ball of this ball-and-socket joint replaced by a metal head that is set in the femur and the socket replaced by a cup
- Other names: Hip arthroplasty
- Specialty: Orthopedic surgery
- ICD-9-CM: 81.51–81.53
- MeSH: D019644
- MedlinePlus: 002975

Hip replacement is a surgical procedure in which the hip joint is replaced by a prosthetic implant, that is, a hip prosthesis. Hip replacement surgery can be performed as a total replacement or a hemi/semi(half) replacement. Such joint replacement orthopaedic surgery is generally conducted to relieve arthritis pain or in some hip fractures. A total hip replacement (total hip arthroplasty) consists of replacing both the acetabulum and the femoral head while hemiarthroplasty generally only replaces the femoral head. Hip replacement is one of the most common orthopaedic operations. Patient satisfaction varies widely between different techniques and implants. Approximately 58% of total hip replacements are estimated to last 25 years. The average cost of a total hip replacement in 2012 was $40,364 in the United States (about €37,300), and in the range of €7,117 to €11,091 in most European countries.

== Medical uses ==
Total hip replacement is most commonly used to treat joint failure caused by osteoarthritis. Other indications include rheumatoid arthritis, avascular necrosis, traumatic arthritis, protrusio acetabuli, certain hip fractures, benign and malignant bone tumors, arthritis associated with Paget's disease, ankylosing spondylitis and juvenile rheumatoid arthritis. The aims of the procedure are pain relief and improvement in hip function. Hip replacement is usually considered only after other therapies, such as physical therapy and pain medications, have failed.

=== Outcomes ===
Hip replacement provides significantly better results than exercise training in terms of reducing pain 6 months afterwards. It is possible to play high-level sport after hip resurfacing. People who have had hip replacements generally have reduced death rates than the matched population for 10 years after surgery, but rates then increase from 11 years onwards. For this reason, hip replacement is often considered in people aged 65 to 80 when activity is being severely curtailed by hip pain. Hip resurfacing is a less invasive type of hip replacement that may be more suitable for younger patients.

== Risks ==
Risks and complications in hip replacement are similar to those associated with all joint replacements. They can include infection, dislocation, limb length inequality, loosening, impingement, osteolysis, metal sensitivity, nerve palsy, chronic pain and death. Weight loss surgery before a hip replacement does not appear to change outcomes.

Edema appears around the hip in the hours or days following the surgery. This swelling is typically at its maximum 7 days after the operation, then decreases and disappears over the course of weeks. Only 5% of patients still have swelling 6 months after the operation.

=== Dislocation ===
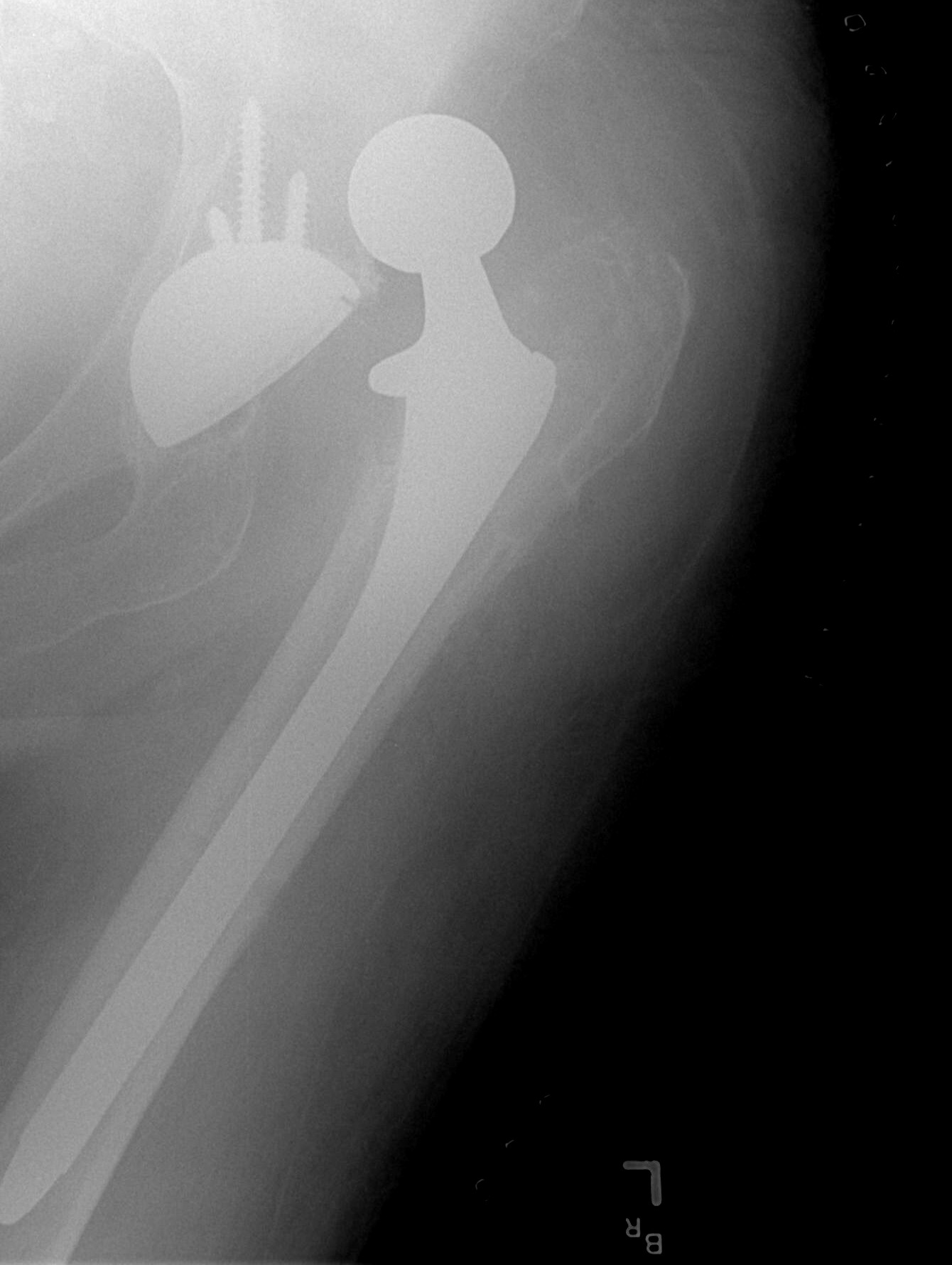
Dislocated artificial hip

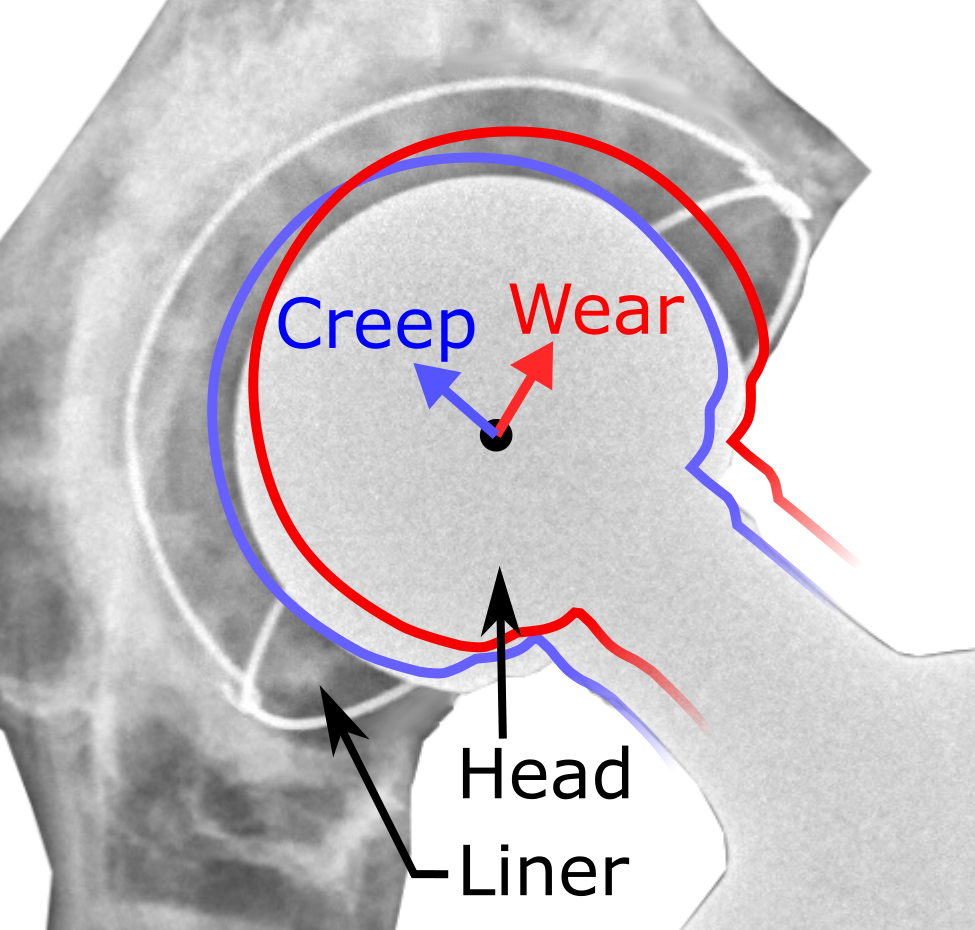
Liner wear, particularly when over 2 mm, increases the risk of dislocation. Liner creep, on the other hand, is normal remoulding.

Dislocation (the ball coming out of the socket) is one of the most common complications. Hip prosthesis dislocation mostly occurs in the first three months after insertion, mainly because of incomplete scar formation and relaxed soft tissues. The chance of this is diminished if less tissue is cut, if the cut tissue is repaired and if large diameter head balls are used. Surgeons who perform more operations tend to have fewer dislocations. Important factors which are related to dislocation are: component positioning, preservation of the gluteal muscles and restoration of leg length and femoral offset. Activity restrictions have not been shown to reduce the risk for dislocation.

Dislocations occurring between three months and five years after insertion usually occur due to malposition of the components, or dysfunction of nearby muscles. Risk factors of late dislocation (after five years) mainly include:

- Female sex
- Younger age
- Previous subluxation without complete dislocation
- Previous trauma
- Substantial weight loss
- Recent onset or progression of dementia or a neurological disorder
- Malposition of the cup
- Liner wear, particularly when it allows head movement of more than 2 mm within the cup compared to its original position
- Prosthesis loosening with migration

=== Infection ===
Infection is one of the most common causes for revision of a total hip replacement. A 2009 study found that the incidence of infection in primary hip replacement was 1% or less in the United States. Risk factors for infection include obesity, diabetes, smoking, immunosuppressive medications or diseases, history of infection and previous hip surgery.

In revision surgery, infected tissue surrounding the joint is removed, and the artificial joint replaced. This can be carried out in one- or two-stage surgery. In two-stage surgery the infected tissue and all joint replacement implants are removed in the first stage, and, after the infection is completely cleared, a new artificial joint is inserted in the second stage. In one-stage surgery infected tissue and implants are removed, and the new joint inserted, in a single procedure. Both kinds of surgery are equally effective but one-stage surgery results in faster recovery.

There is also an alternative called DAIR (debridement antibiotics and implant retention) that is possible if the infection presents during the first month after primary surgery or shortly after the debut of symptoms in a late hematogenous infection. In contrast to 1- or 2-stage revision surgery, DAIR involves replacing only the removable components while retaining the prosthesis itself. Also a thorough debridement of infected tissue is performed, antibiotics are administered and the treatment continuous for at least 6-12 weeks. The success rate of DAIR is approximately 75%, saving a lot of patients from more extensive surgery.

=== Limb length inequality ===
Most adults have a limb length inequality of 0–2 cm which causes no deficits. It is common for people to sense a larger limb length inequality after total hip replacement. Sometimes the leg seems long immediately after surgery when in fact both are equal length. An arthritic hip can develop contractures that make the leg behave as if it is short. When these are relieved with replacement surgery and normal motion and function are restored, the body feels that the limb is now longer than it was. This feeling usually subsides by six months after surgery as the body adjusts to the new hip joint. The cause of this feeling is variable, and usually related to abductor muscle weakness, pelvic obliquity, and minor lengthening of the hip during surgery (<1 cm) to achieve stability and restore the joint to pre-arthritic mechanics. If the limb length difference remains bothersome to the patient more than six months after surgery, a shoe lift can be used. Only in extreme cases is surgery required for correction.

The perceived difference in limb length for a patient after surgery is a common cause for lawsuits against the healthcare provider.

=== Fracture ===
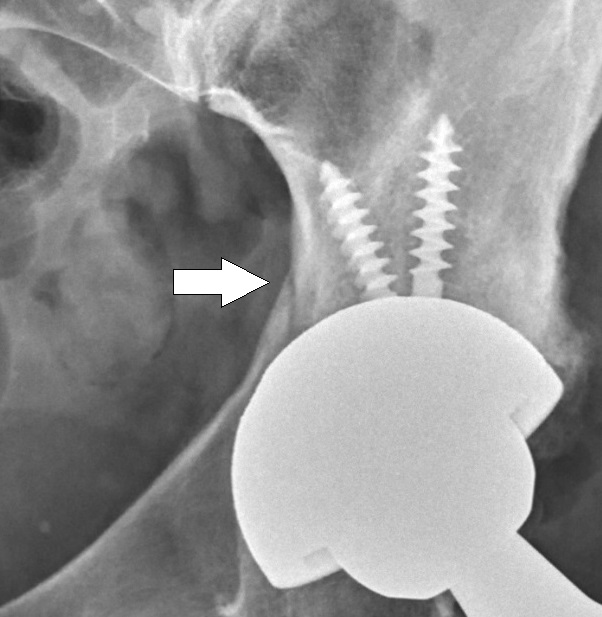
Intraoperative acetabular fracture

Intraoperative fractures may occur. After surgery, bones with internal fixation devices in situ are at risk of periprosthetic fractures at the end of the implant, an area of relative mechanical stress. Post-operative femoral fractures are graded by the Vancouver classification.

=== Vein thrombosis ===
Venous thrombosis such as deep vein thrombosis and pulmonary embolism are relatively common following hip replacement surgery. Standard treatment with anticoagulants is for 7–10 days; however, treatment for 21+ days may be superior. Extended-duration anticoagulants (up to 35 days following surgery) may prevent VTE in people undergoing hip replacement surgery. Other research suggested that anticoagulants in otherwise healthy patients undergoing a so-called fast track protocol with hospital stays under five days, might only be necessary while in the hospital. Emerging evidence supports the use of aspirin for venous thromboembolism prophylaxis. Large randomised control trials suggested that aspirin is not inferior to low-molecular weight heparins and rivaroxaban. However, aspirin may not be appropriate in all cases, especially for patients who have additional risk factors for venous thromboembolisms or may have an inadequate response to aspirin.

Some physicians and patients may consider having an ultrasonography for deep vein thrombosis after hip replacement. However, this kind of screening should only be done when indicated because to perform it routinely would be unnecessary health care.

Intermittent pneumatic compression (IPC) devices are sometimes used for prevention of blood clots following total hip replacement.

=== Osteolysis ===
Many long-term problems with hip replacements are the result of osteolysis. This is the loss of bone caused by the body's reaction to polyethylene wear debris, fine bits of plastic that wear off the cup liner over time. An inflammatory process causes bone resorption that may lead to subsequent loosening of the hip implants and even fractures in the bone around the implants. Ceramic bearing surfaces may eliminate the generation of wear particles. Metal cup liners joined with metal heads (metal-on-metal hip arthroplasty) were developed for similar reasons. In the lab these show excellent wear characteristics and benefit from a different mode of lubrication. Highly cross-linked polyethylene plastic liners experience significantly reduced plastic wear debris. The newer ceramic and metal prostheses may not have long-term performance records. Ceramic piece breakage can lead to catastrophic failure. This occurs in about 2% of implants. They may also cause an audible, high pitched squeaking noise with activity. Metal-on-metal arthroplasty can release metal debris into the body. Highly cross linked polyethylene is not as strong as regular polyethylene. These plastic liners can crack or break free of the metal shell that holds them.

=== Wear and aseptic loosening ===
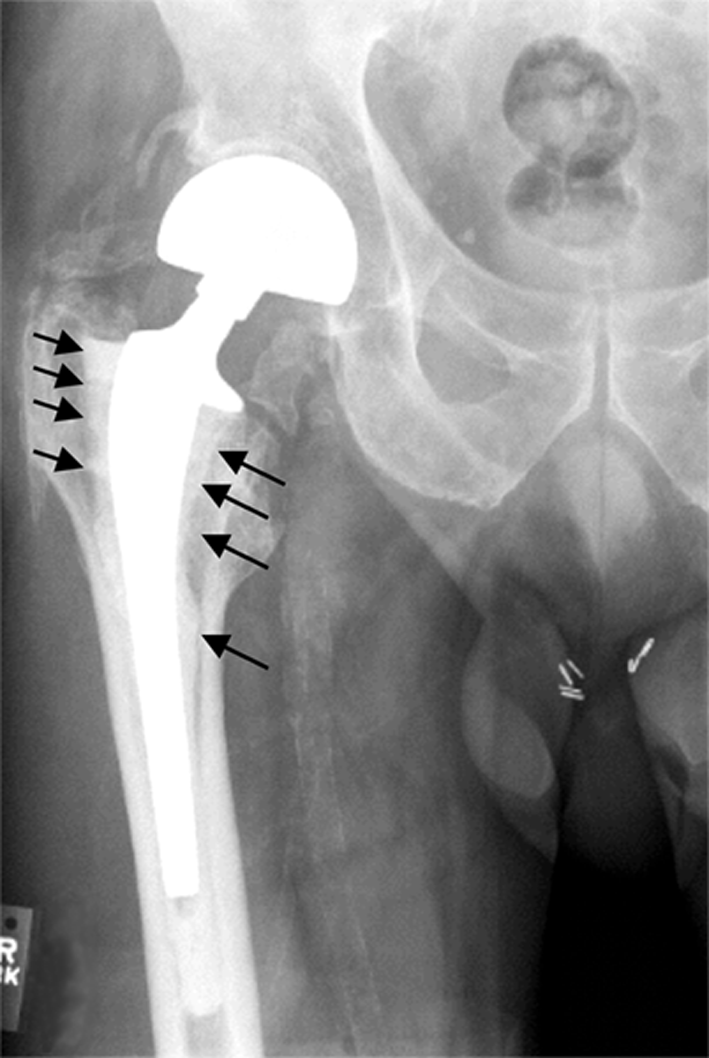
Hip prosthesis displaying aseptic loosening (arrows)

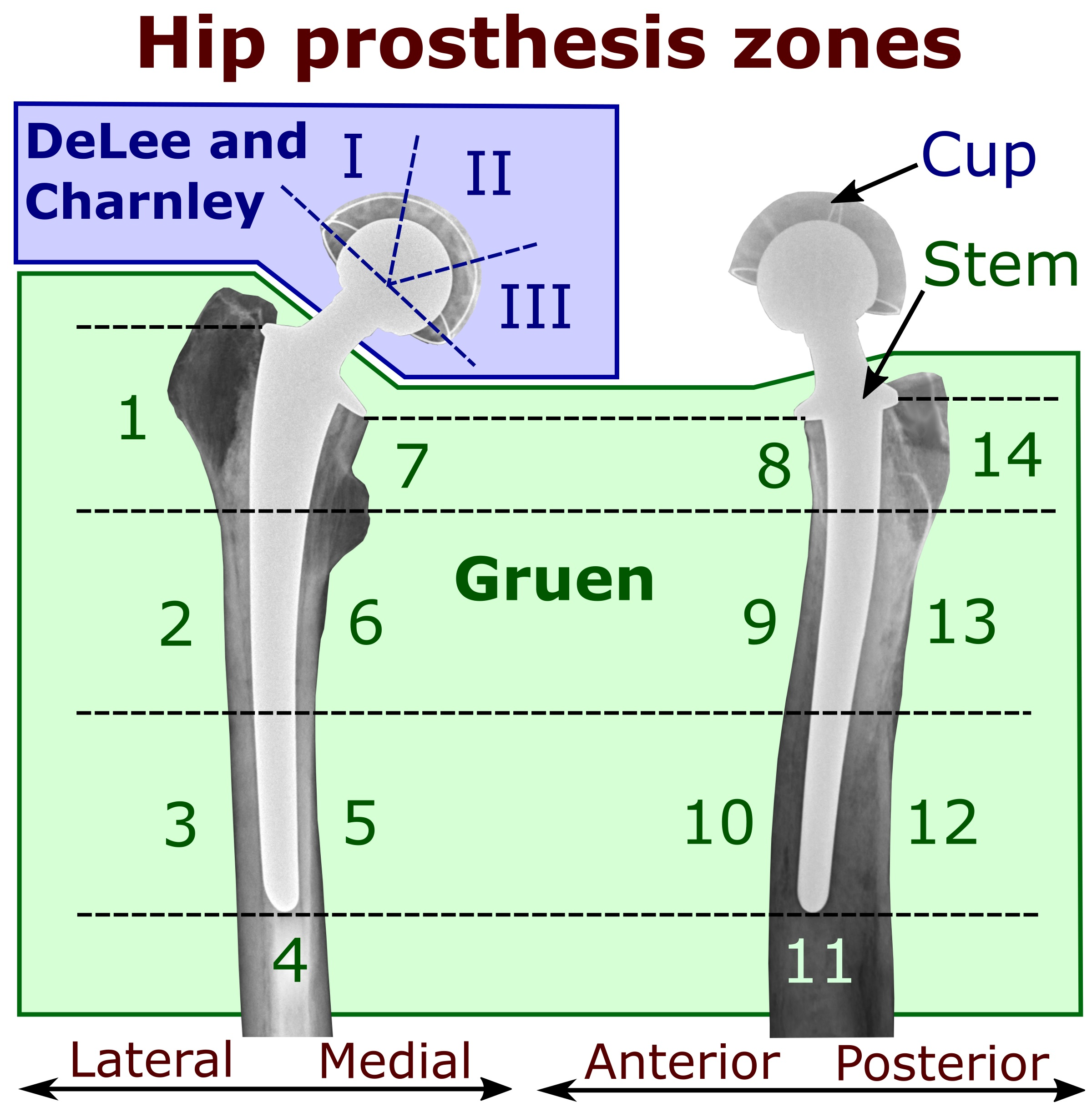
Hip prosthesis zones according to DeLee and Charnley, and Gruen. These are used to describe the location of for example areas of loosening.

Abrasive wear of the polyethylene liner is a common cause of aseptic loosening after total hip arthroplasty. The erosion of the polyethylene liner generates debris, triggering an inflammatory response and subsequent osteolysis and loosening. There seems to be an association between a higher degree of wear and later revision due to loosening. There also seems to be an association between increased wear above 0.1 mm per year and development of osteolysis which could lead to loosening of the implant and a review by Dumbleton et al.suggested a practical threshold of 0.05 mm/year was proposed to minimize the risk of osteolysis due to particle-induced disease.

Signs of loosening could either be radiological, clinical or both. Clinical symptoms include pain and loss of function, while radiological signs constitutes migration of the implant or development of radiolucent lines around the implant. The radiolucent lines can be describe using a seven-zone system of the femur described by Gruen et al. and a three-zone system of the acetabulum described by DeLee and Charnley. On radiography, it is normal to see thin radiolucent areas of less than 2 mm around hip prosthesis components, or between a cement mantle and bone. These may indicate loosening of the prosthesis if they are new or changing, while areas greater than 2 mm may be harmless if they are stable. The most important prognostic factors of cemented cups are absence of radiolucent lines in DeLee and Charnley zone I, as well as adequate cement mantle thickness.

Migration pattern can be different depending on the implants and their fixation method (tapered or untapered stem, cemented or uncemented). An early sign of implant failure seems to be if the acetabular cup migrates more than 1 mm within the first two years after surgery. For each additional millimeter of migration, the risk of revision within ten years increases by about 10%.

=== Metal sensitivity ===
Concerns were raised in the early 2000s regarding metal sensitivity and the potential dangers of metal particulate debris from hip prostheses, including the development of pseudotumors, soft tissue masses containing necrotic tissue, around the hip joint. It appears these masses were more common in women, and these patients showed a higher level of iron in the blood. The cause was then unknown, and was probably multifactorial. There may have been a toxic reaction to an excess of particulate metal wear debris or a hypersensitivity reaction to a "normal" amount of metal debris.

Metal hypersensitivity is a well-established phenomenon and is not uncommon, affecting about 10–15% of the population. Skin contact with certain metals can cause immune reactions such as hives, eczema, redness and itching. Although little is known about the short- and long-term pharmacodynamics and bioavailability of circulating metal degradation products in vivo, there have been many reports of immunologic-type responses temporally associated with implantation of metal components. Individual case reports link immune hypersensitivity reactions with adverse performance of metallic cardiovascular, orthopedic and plastic surgical and dental implants.

=== Metal toxicity ===
Most hip replacements consist of cobalt and chromium alloys, or titanium. Stainless steel is no longer used. Any metal implant releases its constituent ions into the blood. Typically, these are excreted in the urine, but in certain individuals the ions can accumulate in the body. In implants which involve metal-on-metal contact, microscopic fragments of cobalt and chromium can be absorbed into the person's bloodstream. There are reports of cobalt toxicity with hip replacement, particularly metal-on-metal hip replacements, which are no longer in use.

Use of metal-on-metal hip replacements from the 1970s was discontinued in the 1980s and 1990s, particularly after the discovery of aseptic lymphocyte-dominant vasculitis-associated lesions (ALVAL). However, the FDA's 510k approval process allowed companies to have new and "improved" metal-on-metal hips approved without much clinical testing. Some people with these prostheses experienced similar reactions to the metal debris as occurred in the 20th century; some devices were recalled.

=== Nerve palsy ===
Post operative sciatic nerve palsy is another possible complication. The frequency of this complication is low. Femoral nerve palsy is another, but much rarer, complication. Both of these may resolve over time, but the healing process is slow. Patients with pre-existing nerve injury are at greater risk of experiencing this complication and are also slower to recover.

=== Chronic pain ===
A few patients who have had a hip replacement suffer chronic pain after the surgery. Groin pain can develop if the muscle that raises the hip (iliopsoas) rubs against the edge of the acetabular cup. Bursitis can develop at the trochanter where a surgical scar crosses the bone, or if the femoral component used pushes the leg out to the side too far. Also some patients can experience pain in cold or damp weather. Incision made in the front of the hip (anterior approach) can cut a nerve running down the thigh leading to numbness in the thigh and occasionally chronic pain at the point where the nerve was cut (a neuroma).

=== Death ===
The rate of perioperative mortality for elective hip replacements is significantly less than 1%.

=== Metal-on-metal hip implant failure ===
By 2010, reports in the orthopaedic literature increasingly cited the problem of early failure of metal-on-metal prostheses in a small percentage of patients. Failures may have related to the release of minute metallic particles or metal ions from wear on the implants, causing pain and disability severe enough to require revision surgery in 1–3% of patients. Design deficits of some prothesis models, especially with heat-treated alloys and a lack of specialized surgical experience, accounted for most of the failures. In 2010, surgeons at medical centers such as the Mayo Clinic reported curtailing their use of metal-on-metal implants by 80 percent over the previous year, in favor of those made from other materials, such as combinations of metal and plastic. The cause of these failures remains controversial, and may include both design factors, operative technique factors, and factors related to patient immune response. In the United Kingdom, the Medicines and Healthcare products Regulatory Agency commenced an annual monitoring regime for metal-on-metal hip replacement patients from May 2010. Data which are shown in The Australian Orthopaedic Association's 2008 National Joint replacement registry, a record of nearly every hip implanted in that country over the previous 10 years, tracked 6,773 BHR (Birmingham Hip Resurfacing) hips and found that less than 0.33% may have been revised due to the patient's reaction to the metal component. Other, similar, metal-on-metal designs have not fared as well, with some reports showing that 76–100% of people with these metal-on-metal implants with aseptic implant failures and needing revision surgery also had histological evidence of inflammation, accompanied by extensive lymphocyte infiltrates characteristic of delayed-type hypersensitivity reactions. It is not clear to what extent this phenomenon negatively affects orthopedic implant patients. However, for patients presenting with signs of allergic reaction, testing for sensitivity should be conducted. Removal of the device should be considered, since removal may alleviate the symptoms. Patients who have allergic reactions to alloy jewelry are more likely to have reactions to orthopedic implants. There is increasing awareness of the phenomenon of metal sensitivity, and many surgeons now take this into account when planning which implant is optimal for each patient.

On March 12, 2012, The Lancet published a study, based on data from the National Joint Registry of England and Wales, finding that metal-on-metal hip implants failed at much higher rates than other types of hip implants, and calling for a ban on all metal-on-metal hip prostheses. The analysis of 402,051 hip replacements showed that 6.2% of metal-on-metal hip implants had failed within five years, compared to 1.7% of metal-on-plastic and 2.3% of ceramic-on-ceramic hip implants. Each 1 mm (0.039 in) increase in head size of metal-on-metal hip implants was associated with a 2% increase in failure rate. Surgeons of the British Hip Society recommended that large head metal-on-metal implants should no longer be implanted.

On February 10, 2011, the U.S. FDA issued an advisory on metal-on-metal hip implants, stating it was continuing to gather and review all available information about metal-on-metal hip systems. On June 27–28, 2012, an advisory panel met to decide whether to impose new standards, taking into account findings of the study in The Lancet. No new standards, such as routine checking of blood levels of metal ions, were set, but guidance was updated. The U.S. FDA does not require hip implants to be tested in clinical trials before they can be sold in the U.S. Instead, companies making new hip implants only need to prove that they are "substantially equivalent" to other hip implants already on the market. The exception is metal-on-metal implants, which were not tested in clinical trials, but, due to the high revision rate of metal-on-metal hips, the FDA has stated that, in the future, clinical trials will be required for approval, and that post-market studies will be required to keep metal-on-metal hip implants on the market.

== Modern process ==
Hip prosthesis 3D model

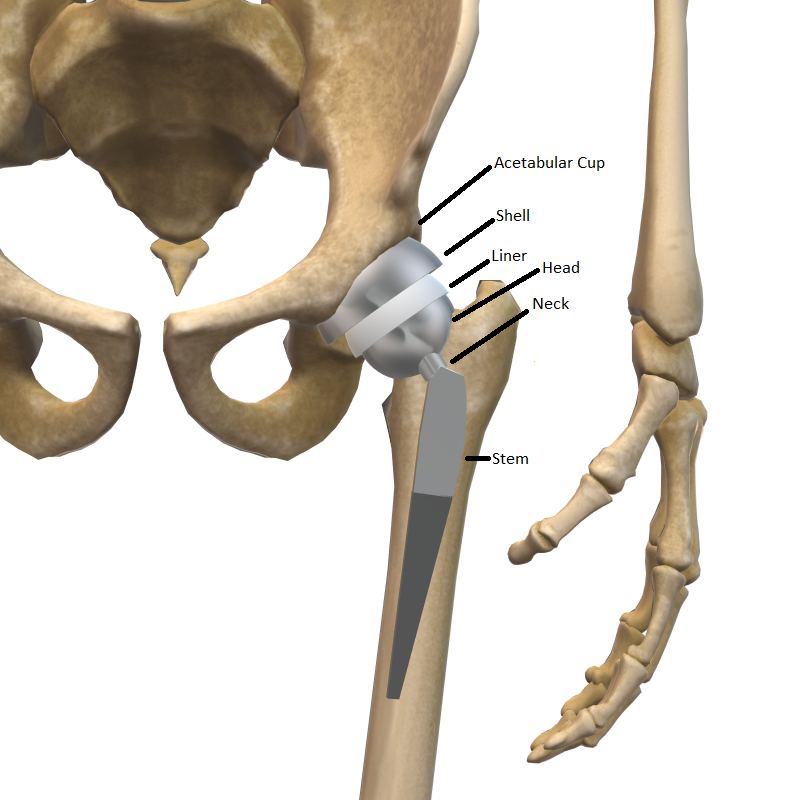
Different parts of hip prosthesis

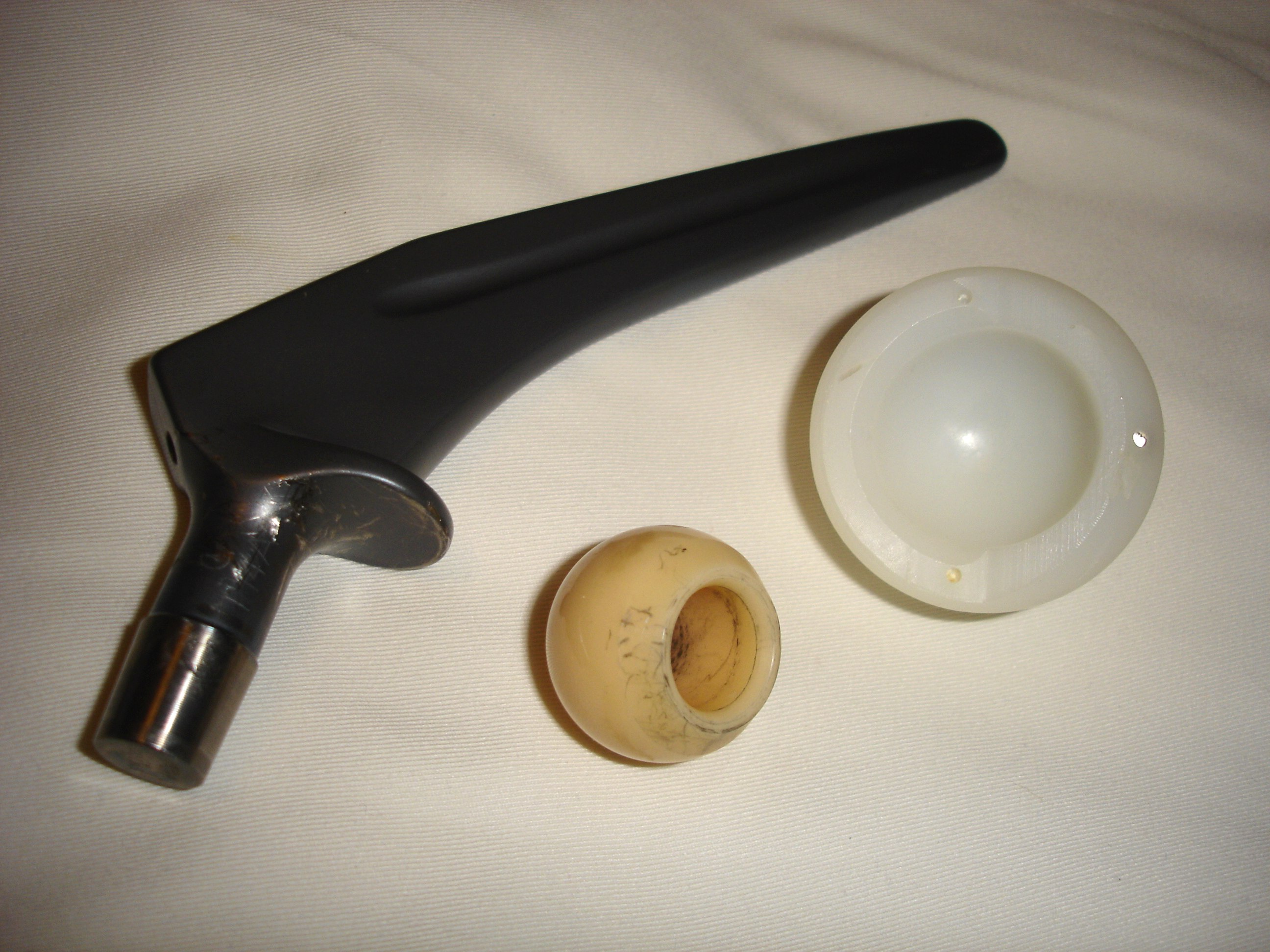
A titanium hip prosthesis, with a ceramic head and polyethylene acetabular cup

The modern artificial joint owes much to the 1962 work of Sir John Charnley at Wrightington Hospital in the United Kingdom. His work in the field of tribology resulted in a design that almost completely replaced the other designs by the 1970s. Charnley's design consisted of three parts:

1. stainless steel one-piece femoral stem and head
2. polyethylene (originally Teflon), acetabular component, both of which were fixed to the bone using
3. Poly(methyl methacrylate) (acrylic) bone cement

The replacement joint, which was known as the low friction arthroplasty, was lubricated with synovial fluid. The small femoral head (7/8 in (22.2 mm)) was chosen for Charnley's belief that it would have lower friction against the acetabular component and thus wear out the acetabulum more slowly. Unfortunately, the smaller head dislocated more easily. Alternative designs with larger heads such as the Mueller prosthesis were proposed. Stability was improved, but acetabular wear and subsequent failure rates were increased with these designs. The Teflon acetabular components of Charnley's early designs failed within a year or two of implantation. This prompted a search for a more suitable material. A German salesman showed a polyethylene gear sample to Charnley's machinist, sparking the idea to use this material for the acetabular component. The ultra-high-molecular-weight polyethylene acetabular component was introduced in 1962. Charnley's other major contribution was to use polymethylmethacrylate bone cement to attach the two components to the bone. For over two decades, the Charnley Low Friction Arthroplasty, and derivative designs were the most used systems in the world. It formed the basis for all modern hip implants. An example can be seen at the Science Museum, London.

The Exeter hip stem was developed in the United Kingdom during the same time as the Charnley device. Its development occurred following a collaboration between Orthopaedic Surgeon Robin Ling and University of Exeter engineer Clive Lee and it was first implanted at the Princess Elizabeth Orthopaedic Hospital in Exeter in 1970. The Exeter Hip is a cemented device, but with a slightly different stem geometry. Both designs have shown excellent long-term durability when properly placed and are still widely used in slightly modified versions.

Early implant designs had the potential to loosen from their attachment to the bones, typically becoming painful ten to twelve years after placement. In addition, erosion of the bone around the implant was seen on x-rays. Initially, surgeons believed this was caused by an abnormal reaction to the cement holding the implant in place. That belief prompted a search for an alternative method to attach the implants. The Austin Moore device had a small hole in the stem into which bone graft was placed before implanting the stem. It was hoped bone would then grow through the window over time and hold the stem in position. Success was unpredictable and the fixation not very robust. In the early 1980s, surgeons in the United States applied a coating of small beads to the Austin Moore device and implanted it without cement. The beads were constructed so that gaps between beads matched the size of the pores in native bone. Over time, bone cells from the patient would grow into these spaces and fix the stem in position. The stem was modified slightly to fit more tightly into the femoral canal, resulting in the Anatomic Medullary Locking (AML) stem design. With time, other forms of stem surface treatment and stem geometry have been developed and improved.

Initial hip designs were made of a one-piece femoral component and a one-piece acetabular component. Current designs have a femoral stem and separate head piece. Using an independent head allows the surgeon to adjust leg length (some heads seat more or less onto the stem) and to select from various materials from which the head is formed. A modern acetabulum component is also made up of two parts: a metal shell with a coating for bone attachment and a separate liner. First the shell is placed. Its position can be adjusted, unlike the original cemented cup design which are fixed in place once the cement sets. When proper positioning of the metal shell is obtained, the surgeon may select a liner made from various materials. To combat loosening caused by polyethylene wear debris, hip manufacturers developed improved and novel materials for the acetabular liners. Ceramic heads mated with regular polyethylene liners or a ceramic liner were the first significant alternative. Metal liners to mate with a metal head were also developed. At the same time these designs were being developed, the problems that caused polyethylene wear were determined and manufacturing of this material improved. Highly crosslinked ultra-high-molecular-weight polyethylene was introduced in the late 1990s. The most recent data comparing the various bearing surfaces has shown no clinically significant differences in their performance. Potential early problems with each material are discussed below. Performance data after 20 or 30 years may be needed to demonstrate significant differences in the devices. All newer materials allow use of larger diameter femoral heads. Use of larger heads significantly decreases the chance of the hip dislocating, which remains the greatest complication of the surgery.

When available implants are used, cemented stems tend to have a better longevity than uncemented stems. No significant difference is observed in the clinical performance of the various methods of surface treatment of uncemented devices. Uncemented stems are selected for patients with good quality bone that can resist the forces needed to drive the stem in tightly. Cemented devices are typically selected for patients with poor quality bone who are at risk of fracture during stem insertion. Cemented stems are less expensive due to lower manufacturing cost, but require good surgical technique to place them correctly. Uncemented stems can cause pain with activity in up to 20% of patients during the first year after placement as the bone adapts to the device. This is rarely seen with cemented stems.

== Techniques ==
Each technique is defined by its relation to the gluteus medius. The approaches are posterior (Moore), lateral (Hardinge or Liverpool), antero-lateral (Watson-Jones), anterior (Smith-Petersen) and greater trochanter osteotomy. The literature offers no compelling evidence for any particular approach.

=== Posterior ===
The posterior (Moore or Southern) approach accesses the joint and capsule through the back, taking piriformis muscle and the short external rotators of the femur. This approach gives excellent access to the acetabulum and femur and preserves the hip abductors and thus minimizes the risk of abductor dysfunction post operatively. It has the advantage of becoming a more extensile approach if needed. Critics cite a higher dislocation rate, although repair of the capsule, piriformis and the short external rotators along with use of modern large diameter head balls reduces this risk. Limited evidence suggests that the posterior approach may cause less nerve damage.

=== Lateral approach ===
The lateral approach requires elevation of the hip abductors (gluteus medius and gluteus minimus) to access the joint. The abductors may be lifted up by osteotomy of the greater trochanter and reapplying it afterwards using wires (as per Charnley), or may be divided at their tendinous portion, or through the functional tendon (as per Hardinge) and repaired using sutures. Although this approach has a lower dislocation risk than the posterior approach, critics note that occasionally the abductor muscles do not heal back on, leading to pain and weakness which can be difficult to treat.

=== Antero-lateral ===
The anterolateral approach develops the interval between the tensor fasciae latae and the gluteus medius. The gluteus medius, gluteus minimus and hip capsule are detached from the anterior (front) for the greater trochanter and femoral neck and then repaired with heavy suture after the replacement.

=== Anterior ===
The anterior approach uses an interval between the sartorius muscle and tensor fasciae latae. This approach, which was commonly used for pelvic fracture repair surgery, has been adapted for use in hip replacement. When used with older hip implant systems that had a small diameter head, dislocation rates were reduced compared to posterior surgery. Modern implant designs offer similar dislocation rates across the anterior and posterior approaches. The anterior approach has been shown in studies to variably improve early functional recovery, with possible complications of femoral component loosening and early revision.

=== Minimally invasive approaches ===
The AMIS approach (Anterior Minimally Invasive Surgery) is a variation of the direct anterior approach to hip arthroplasty. It is performed through an intermuscular and internervous interval, which may reduce soft tissue damage and support faster early recovery. Dedicated AMIS instrumentation is used to support soft tissue preservation, procedural reproducibility, and limb positioning, facilitating surgical workflow and exposure, including in more challenging cases. Clinical studies have reported acceptable complication rates and remarkable functional outcomes. As with other minimally invasive approaches, a learning curve has been described, which may be mitigated through structured training and educational programs.

The dual incision approach and other minimally invasive surgery seeks to reduce soft tissue damage through reducing the size of the incision. However, component positioning accuracy and visualization of the bone structures can be significantly impaired as the incisions get smaller. This can result in unintended fractures and soft tissue injury. The majority of orthopedic surgeons use a "minimally invasive" approach compared to traditional approaches which were quite large comparatively.

Computer-assisted surgery and robotic surgery techniques are available to guide the surgeon to provide enhanced component accuracy. Several commercial CAS and robotic systems are available. Improved patient outcomes and reduced complications have not been demonstrated by these systems.

=== Pain control ===
Controlling pain during the surgery and after surgery is important. During surgery, systematic analgesia is commonly used, however peripheral nerve blocks and neuraxial blocks have been suggested and may be effective at reducing pain and the choice depends on individual preferences/factors and surgeon preference.

== Implants ==
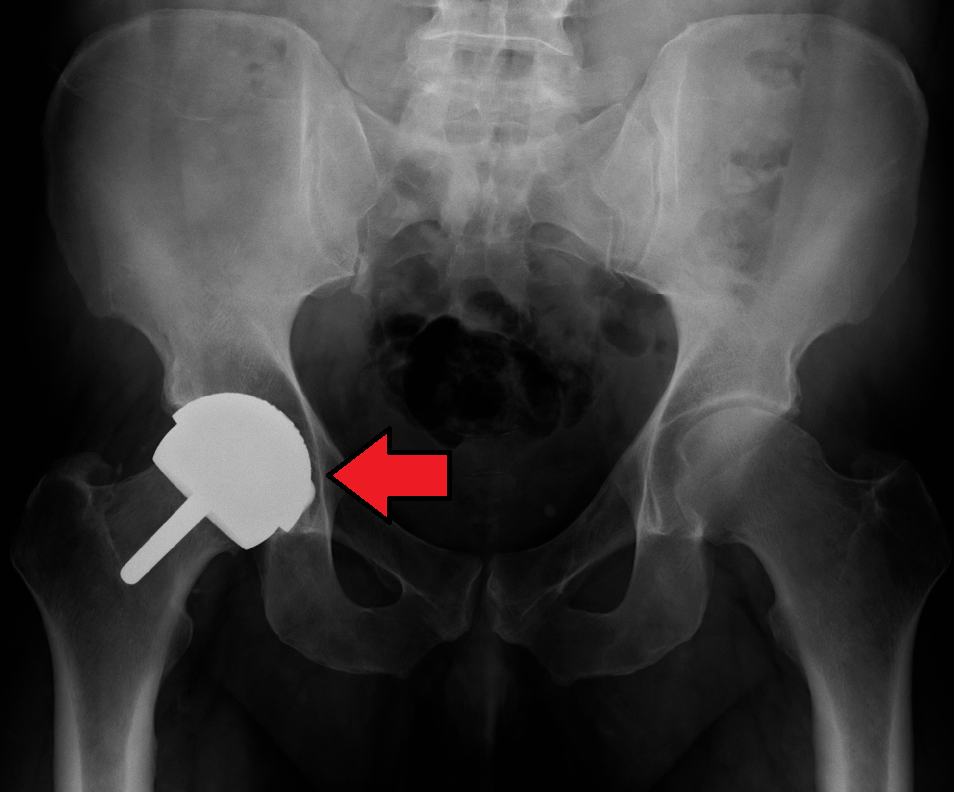
Metal on metal prosthetic hip

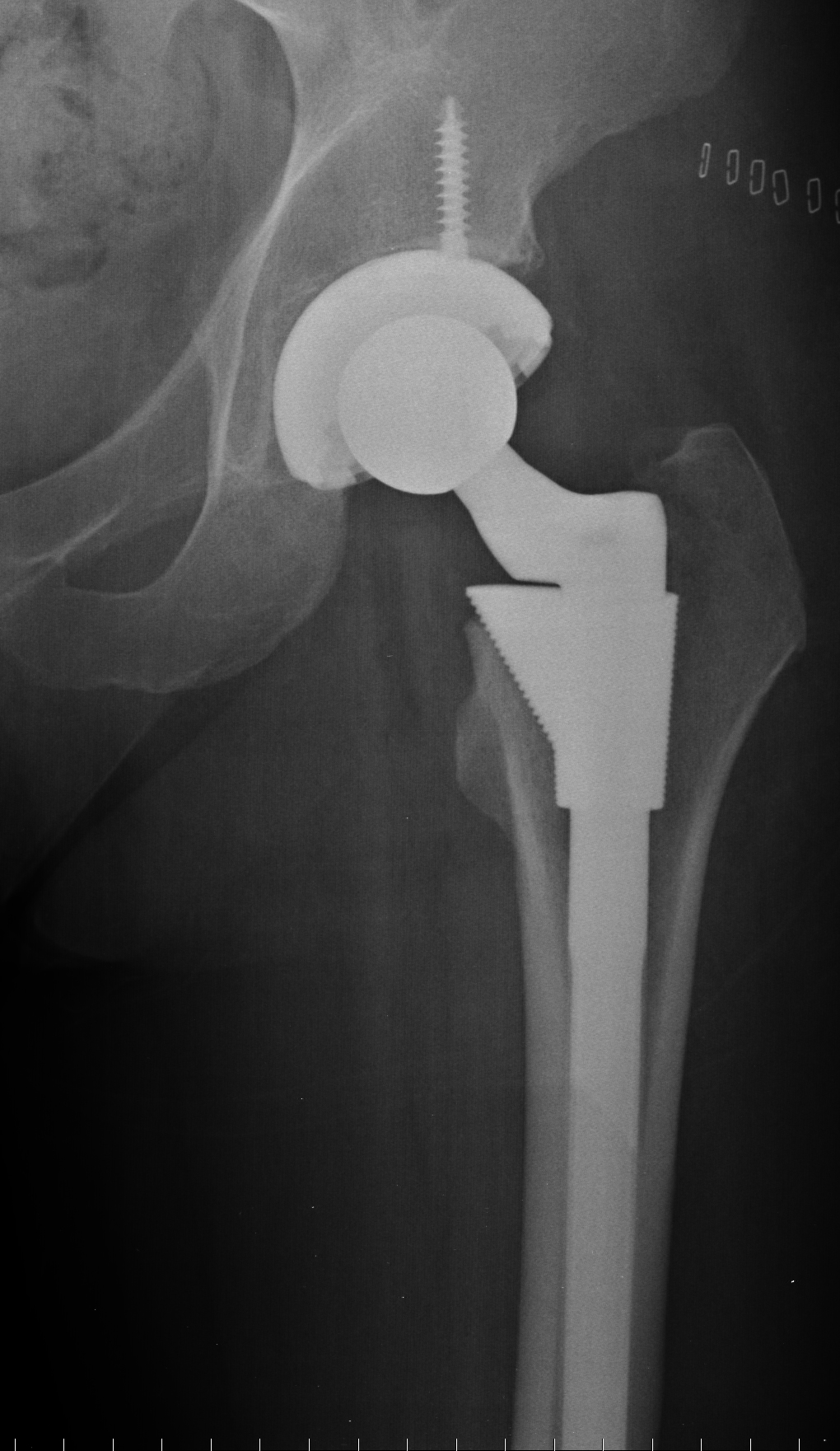
Cement-free implant sixteen days after surgery. Femoral component is cobalt chromium combined with titanium which induces bone growth into the implant. Ceramic head. Acetabular cup coated with bone growth-inducing material and held temporarily in place with a single screw.

The prosthetic implant used in hip replacement consists of three parts: the acetabular cup, the femoral component, and the articular interface. Options exist for different people and indications. The evidence for a number of newer devices is not very good, including: ceramic-on-ceramic bearings, modular femoral necks, and uncemented monoblock cups.

=== Acetabular cup ===
The acetabular cup is the component which is placed into the acetabulum (hip socket). Cartilage and bone are removed from the acetabulum and the acetabular cup is attached using friction or cement. Some acetabular cups are one piece, while others are modular. One-piece (monobloc) shells are either ultra-high-molecular-weight polyethylene or metal, they have their articular surface machined on the inside surface of the cup and do not rely on a locking mechanism to hold a liner in place. A monobloc polyethylene cup is cemented in place while a metal cup is held in place by a metal coating on the outside of the cup. Modular cups consist of two pieces, a shell and liner. The shell is made of metal; the outside has a porous coating while the inside contains a locking mechanism designed to accept a liner. Two types of porous coating used to form a friction fit are sintered beads and a foam metal design to mimic the trabeculae of cancellous bone and initial stability is influenced by under-reaming and insertion force. Permanent fixation is achieved as bone grows onto or into the porous coating. Screws can be used to lag the shell to the bone providing even more fixation. Polyethylene liners are placed into the shell and connected by a rim locking mechanism; ceramic and metal liners are attached with a Morse taper.

=== Articular interface ===
The articular interface is not part of either implant, rather it is the area between the acetabular cup and femoral component. The articular interface of the hip is a simple ball and socket joint. Size, material properties and machining tolerances at the articular interface can be selected based on patient demand to optimise implant function and longevity whilst mitigating associated risks. The interface size is measured by the outside diameter of the head or the inside diameter of the socket. Common sizes of femoral heads are 28 mm (1.1 in), 32 mm (1.3 in) and 36 mm (1.4 in). While 22.25 mm (7/8 in) was common in the first modern prostheses, now even larger sizes are available from 38 to over 54 mm. Larger-diameter heads lead to increased stability and range of motion whilst lowering the risk of dislocation. At the same time they are also subject to higher stresses such as friction and inertia. Different combinations of materials have different physical properties which can be coupled to reduce the amount of wear debris generated by friction. Typical pairings of materials include metal on polyethylene (MOP), metal on crosslinked polyethylene (MOXP), ceramic on ceramic (COC), ceramic on crosslinked polyethylene (COXP), and metal on metal (MOM). Each combination has different advantages and disadvantages.

Dual mobility hip replacements reduce the risk of dislocation.

== Configuration ==
Post-operative projectional radiography is routinely performed to ensure proper configuration of hip prostheses.

The direction of the acetabular cup influences the range of motion of the leg, and also affects the risk of dislocation. For this purpose, the acetabular inclination and the acetabular anteversion are measurements of cup angulation in the coronal plane and the sagittal plane, respectively.

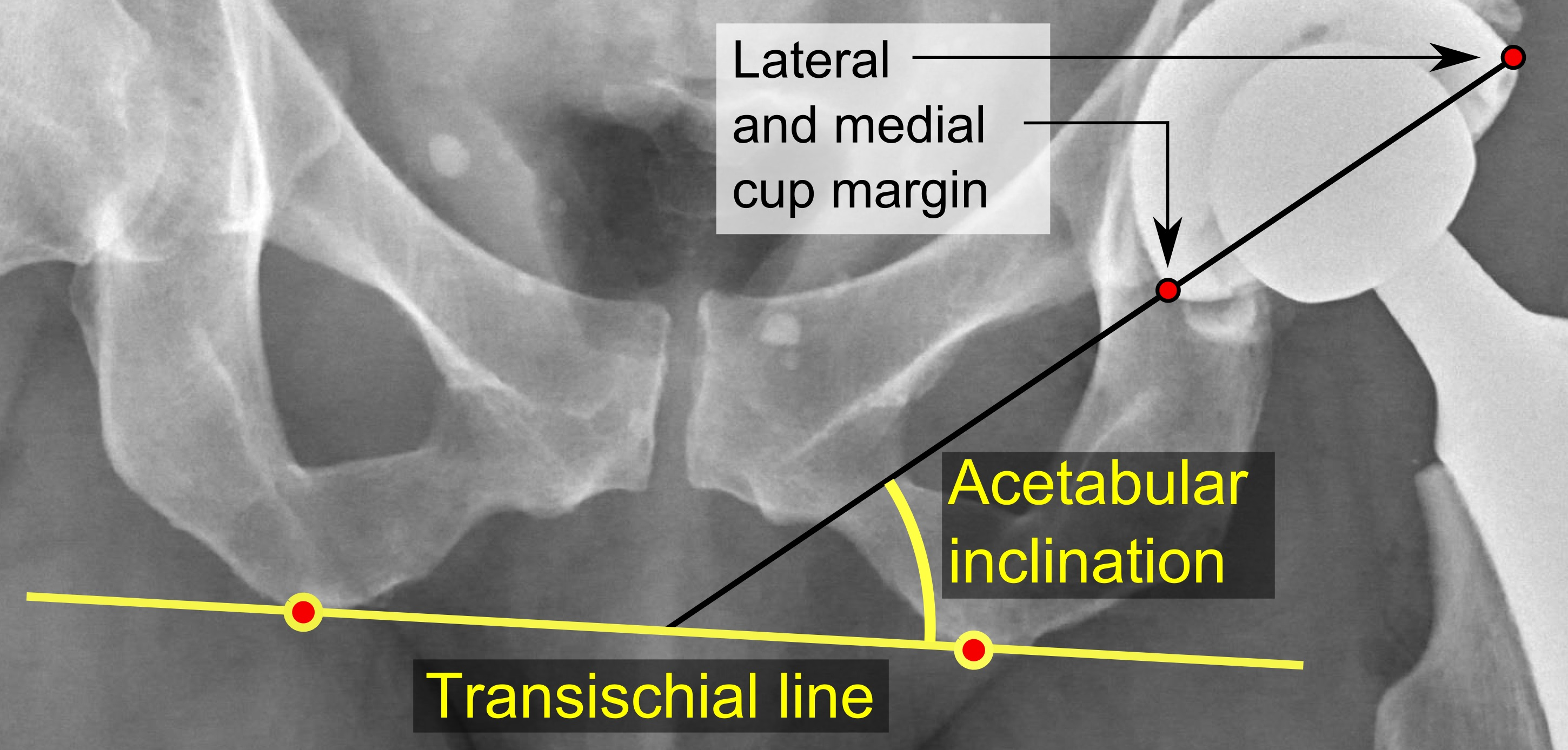
Acetabular inclination. This parameter is calculated on an anteroposterior radiograph as the angle between a line through the lateral and medial margins of the acetabular cup and the transischial line which is tangential to the inferior margins of the ischium bones.

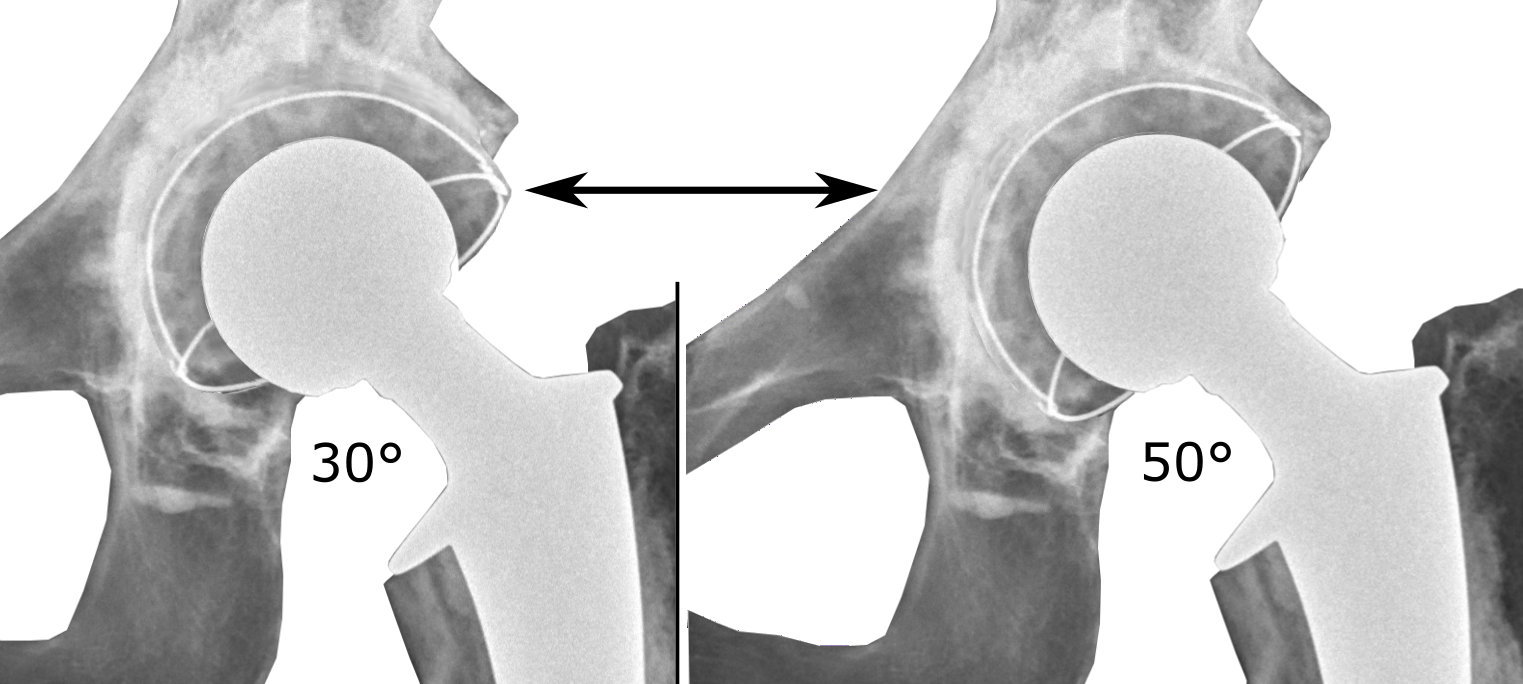
Acetabular inclination is normally between 30 and 50°. A larger angle increases the risk of dislocation.

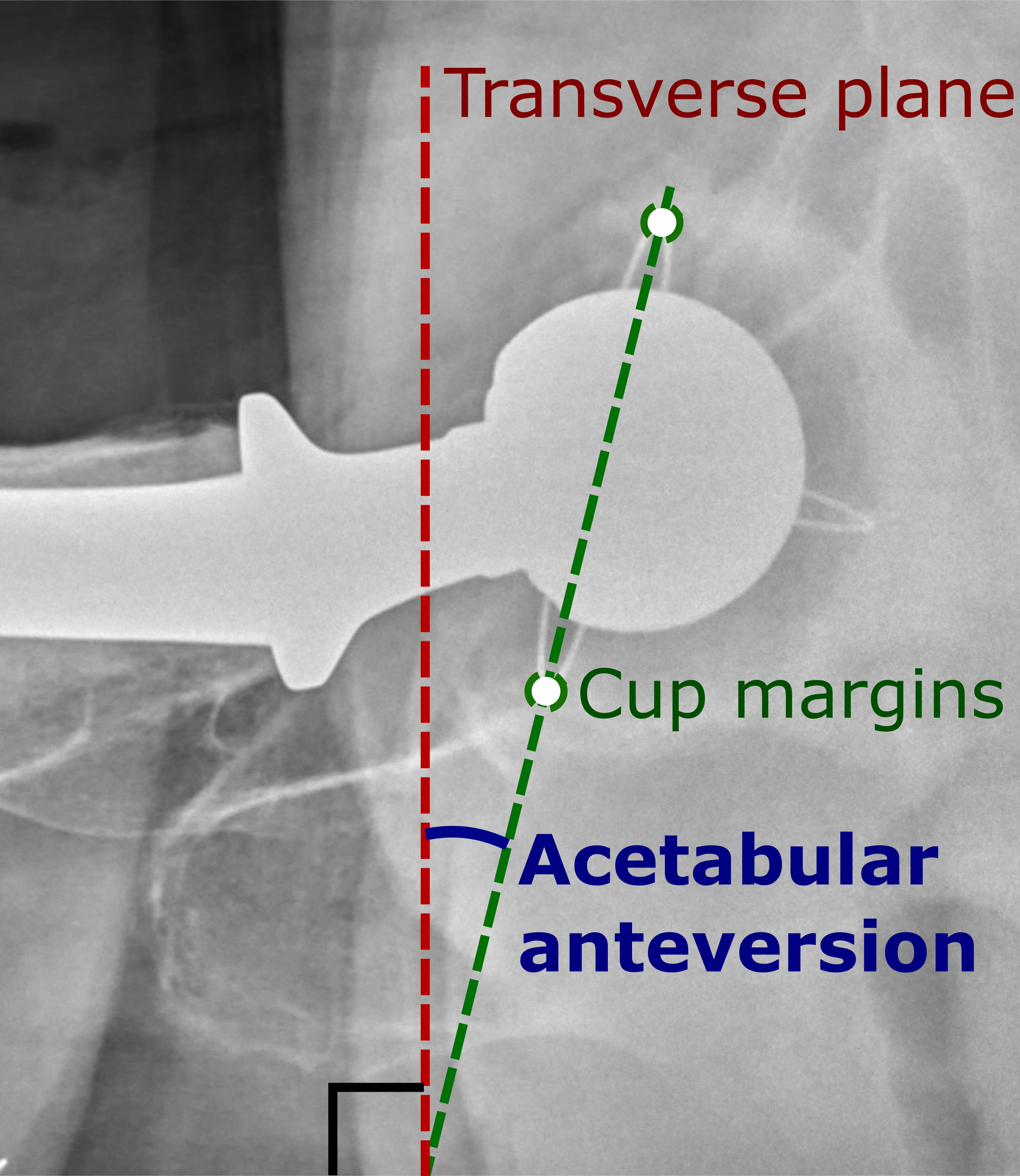
Acetabular anteversion. This parameter is calculated on a lateral radiograph as the angle between the transverse plane and a line going through the (anterior and posterior) margins of the acetabular cup.

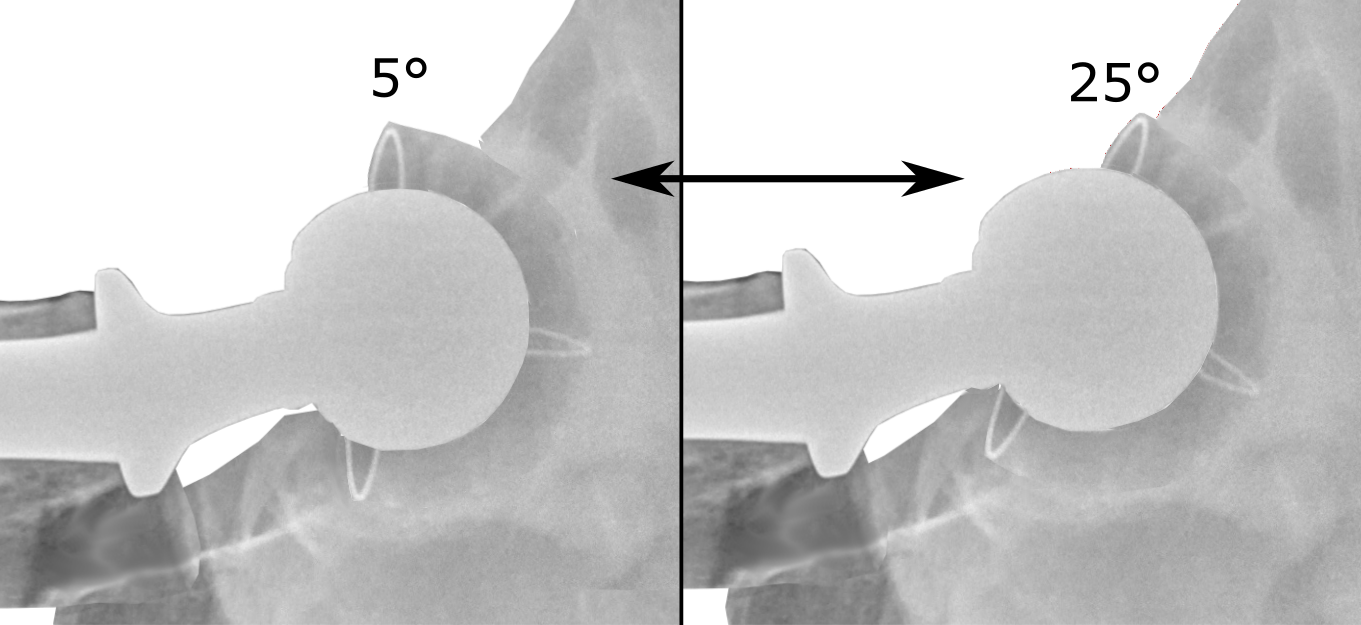
Acetabular anteversion is normally between 5 and 25°. An anteversion below or above this range increases the risk of dislocation. There is an intra-individual variability in this method because the pelvis may be tilted in various degrees in relation to the transverse plane.

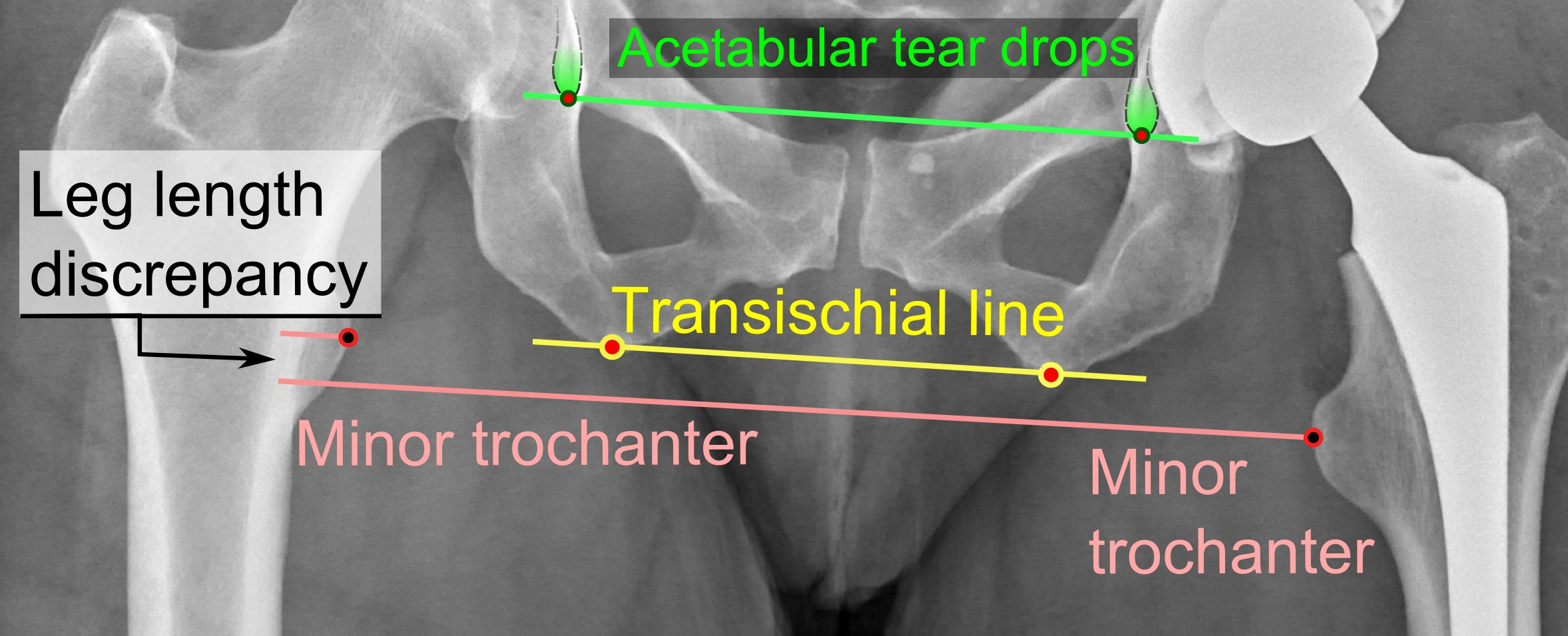
Leg length discrepancy after hip replacement is calculated as the vertical distance between the middle of the minor trochanters, using the acetabular tear drops or the transischial line as references for the horizontal plane. A discrepancy of up to 1 cm is generally tolerated.

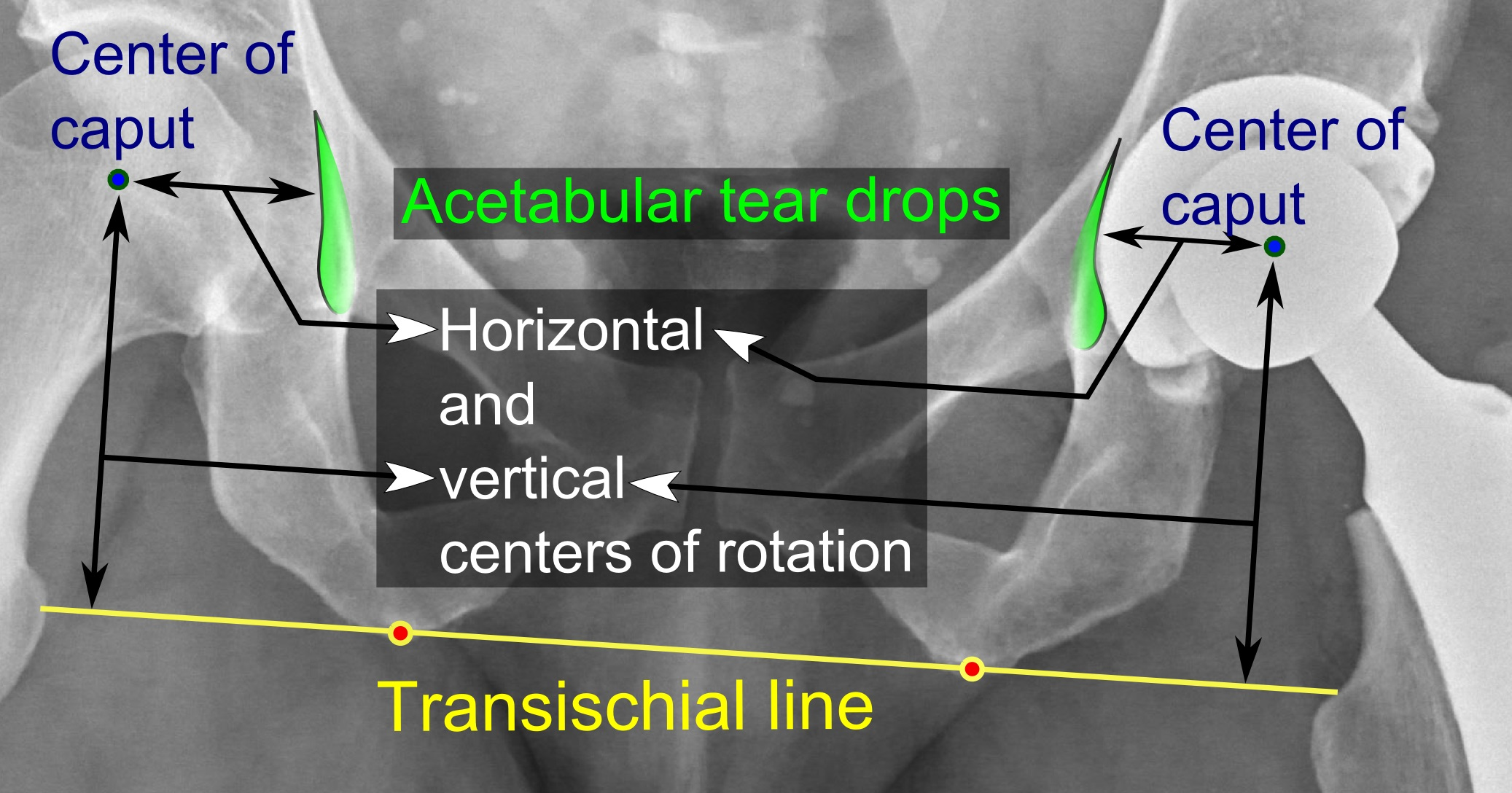
Center of rotation: The horizontal center of rotation is calculated as the distance between the acetabular teardrop and the center of the head (or caput) of the prosthesis and/or the native femoral head on the contralateral side. The vertical center of rotation instead uses the transischial line for reference. The parameter should be equal on both sides.

== Alternatives and variations ==
=== Conservative management ===
The first line approach as an alternative to hip replacement is conservative management which involves a multimodal approach of oral medication, injections, activity modification and physical therapy. Conservative management can prevent or delay the need for hip replacement.

=== Preoperative care ===
Preoperative education is an important part of patient care. Some evidence indicates that it may slightly reduce anxiety before hip or knee replacement, with low risk of negative effects.

=== Hemiarthroplasty ===
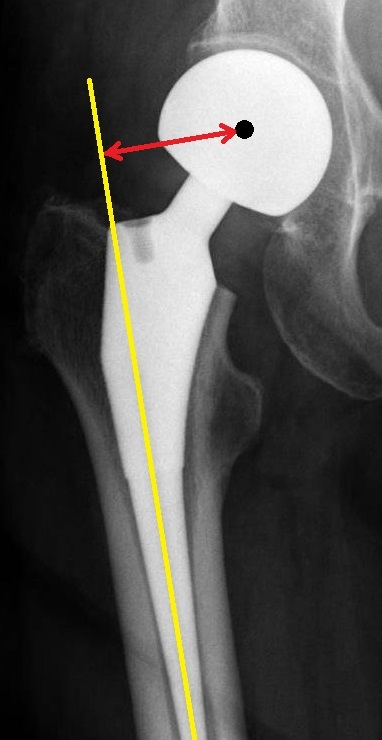
Femoral (neck) offset is defined as the perpendicular distance between the intramedullary or longitudinal axis of the femur and the center of rotation of the native or prosthetic femoral head. An offset of less than 33 mm is associated with hip dislocation.

Hemiarthroplasty is a surgical procedure that replaces one half of the joint with an artificial surface and leaves the other part unchanged. This class of procedure is most commonly performed on the hip after an intracapsular fracture of the femur neck (hip fracture). The procedure is performed by removing the head of the femur and replacing it with a metal or composite prosthesis. The most commonly used prosthesis designs are the Austin Moore and Thompson prostheses. A composite of metal and high-density polyethylene that forms two interphases (bipolar prosthesis) can be used. The monopolar prosthesis has not been shown to offer any advantage over bipolar designs. The procedure is recommended only for elderly/frail patients, due to their lower life expectancy and activity level. This is because over time the prosthesis tends to loosen or to erode the acetabulum. Independently mobile older adults with hip fractures may benefit from a total hip replacement instead of hemiarthroplasty.

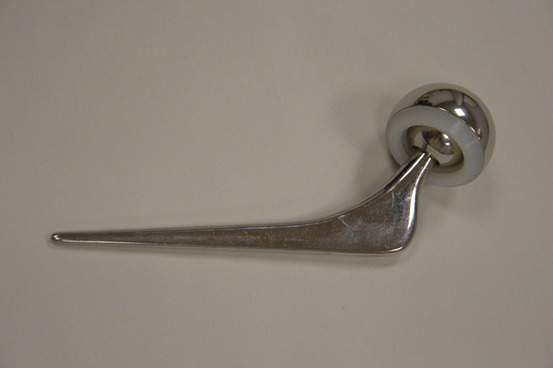
Hip prosthesis for hemiarthroplasty. This example is bipolar, meaning that the head has two separate articulations.

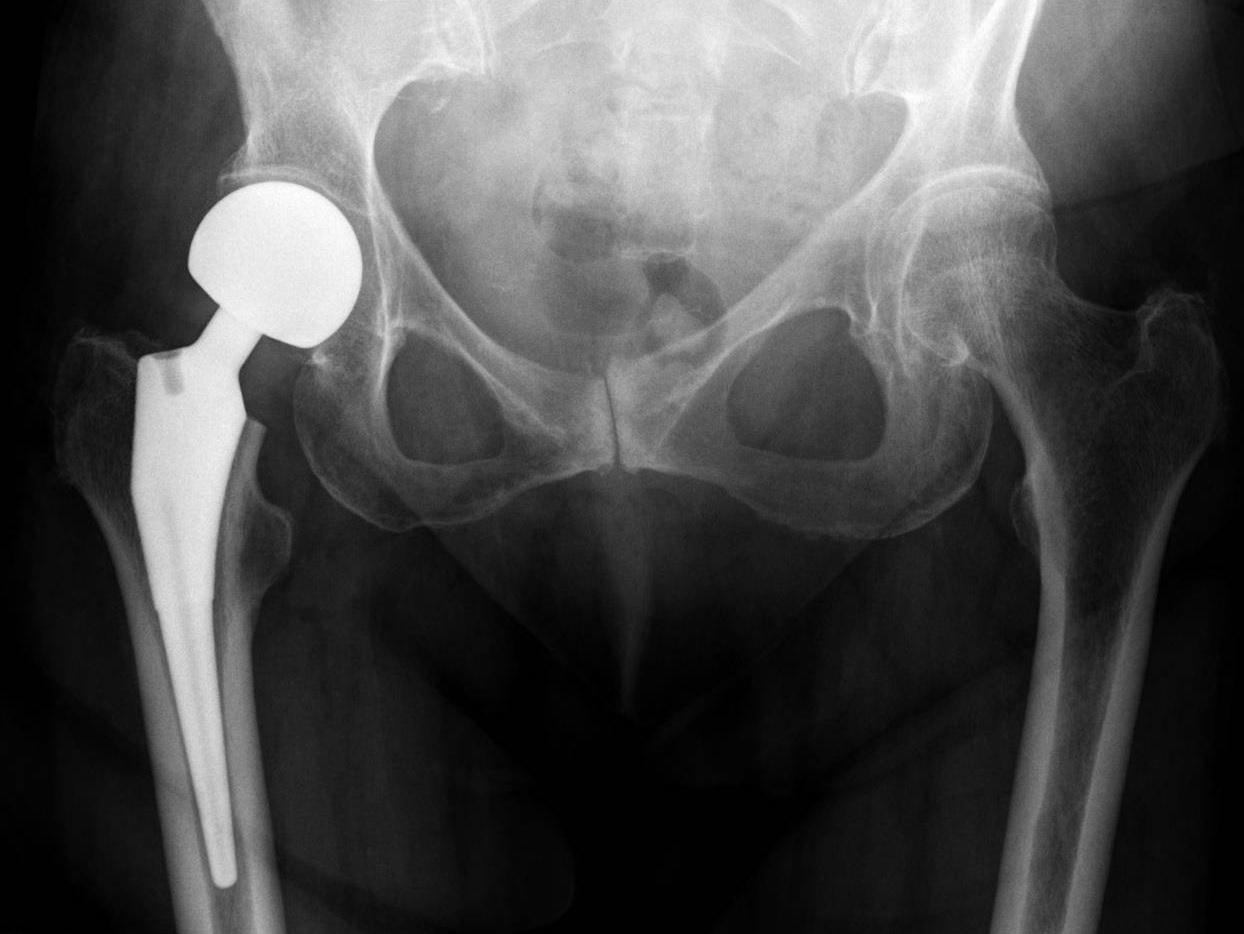
X-ray of the hips, with a right-sided hemiarthroplasty

=== Hip resurfacing ===
Hip resurfacing is an alternative to hip replacement surgery. It has been used in Europe since 1998 and became a common procedure. Health-related quality of life measures are markedly improved and patient satisfaction is favorable after hip resurfacing arthroplasty.

The minimally invasive hip resurfacing procedure is a further refinement to hip resurfacing.

=== Viscosupplementation ===
Viscosupplementation is the injection of artificial lubricants into the joint. Use of these medications in the hip is off label. The cost of treatment is typically not covered by health insurance.

Some authorities claim that the future of osteoarthritis treatment is bioengineering, targeting the growth and/or repair of the damaged, arthritic joint. Centeno et al. reported on the partial regeneration of an arthritic human hip joint using mesenchymal stem cells. It is yet to be shown that this result will apply to a large group of patients and result in significant benefits. The FDA stated that this procedure does not conform to regulations, but Centeno claims that it is exempt from FDA regulation. It has not been shown in controlled clinical trials to be effective.

== Prevalence and cost ==
Total hip replacement incidence varies in developed countries between 30 (Romania) and 290 (Germany) procedures per 100,000 population per year. Approximately 0.8% of Americans have undergone the procedure.

According to the International Federation of Healthcare Plans, the average cost of a total hip replacement in 2012 was $40,364 in the United States, $11,889 in the United Kingdom, $10,987 in France, $9,574 in Switzerland, and $7,731 in Spain. In the United States, the average cost of a total hip replacement varies widely by geographic region, ranging from $11,327 (Birmingham, Alabama) to $73,927 (Boston, Massachusetts).

== History ==
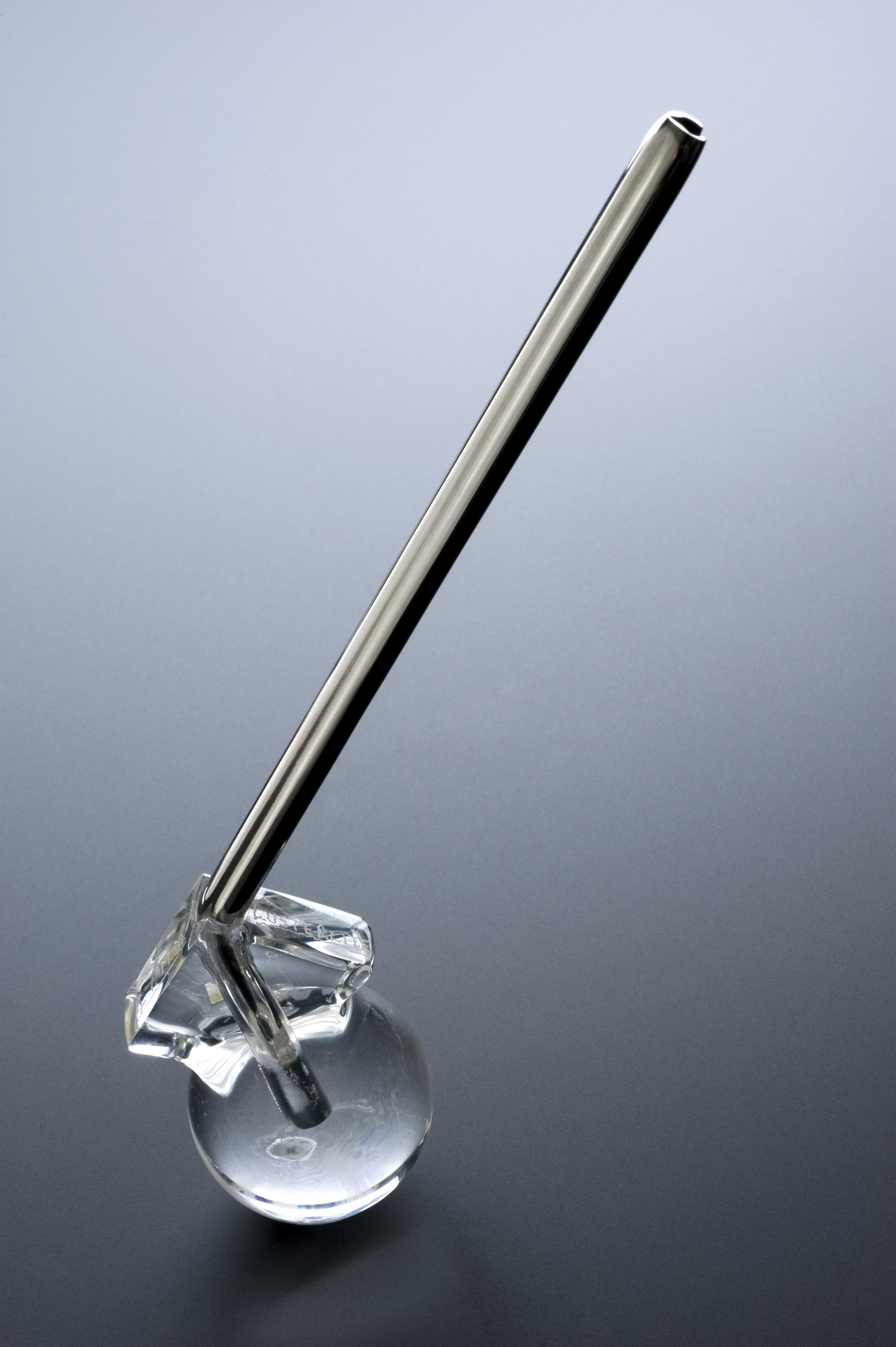
Gosset-style hip prosthesis from 1960

The earliest recorded attempts at hip replacement were carried out in Germany in 1891 by Themistocles Gluck (1853–1942), who used ivory to replace the femoral head (the ball on the femur), attaching it with nickel-plated screws. Subsequently, he used a cement made from plaster of Paris, powdered pumice and glue.

Molded-glass implants were introduced in the 1920s by Smith-Peterson in the USA. Although these showed good bio-compatibility, they were mechanically fragile so he started experiments with metallic prostheses in the 1930s. In 1938, Philip Wiles of Middlesex General Hospital, UK carried out a total hip replacement using a stainless-steel prosthesis attached by bolts. In 1940, Dr. Austin T. Moore (1899–1963) at Columbia Hospital in Columbia, South Carolina performed a hip replacement using a prototype prosthesis made of the cobalt-chrome alloy Vitallium; it was inserted into the medullary canal and "fenestrated" to promote bone regrowth. A commercial version known as the "Austin Moore Prosthesis" was introduced in 1952; it is still in use today, typically for femoral neck fractures in the elderly. Following the lead of Wiles, several UK general hospitals including Norwich, Wrightington, Stanmore, Redhill and Exeter developed metal-based prostheses during the 1950s and 1960s.

Robert Juditt was the first to perform hip replacements via the anterior approach in 1947 in Paris. He taught this method to Émile Letournel. Joel Matta, who had studied with Letournel, brought this approach to the United States and went on to popularize it.

Metal/Acrylic prostheses were tried in the 1950s but were found to be susceptible to wear. In the 1960s, John Charnley at Wrightington General Hospital combined a metal prosthesis with a PTFE acetabular cup before settling on a metal/polyethylene design. Ceramic bearings were developed in the late 1970s.

The means of attachment have also diversified. Early prostheses were attached by screws (e.g. Gluck, Wiles) with later developments using dental or bone cements (e.g. Charnley, Thompson) or cementless systems which relied on bone regrowth (Austin-Moore, Ring). The choice of alloy, bearing material, attachment and detailed geometry has led to the wide variety of prosthesis designs available today.

The London Science Museum has a collection of hip prostheses which reflect developments in the US, UK and elsewhere. These show the use of different materials and different designs for different circumstances (e.g. cemented and uncemented arthroplasty.) Some are on display in the museum's "Medicine: The Wellcome Galleries".

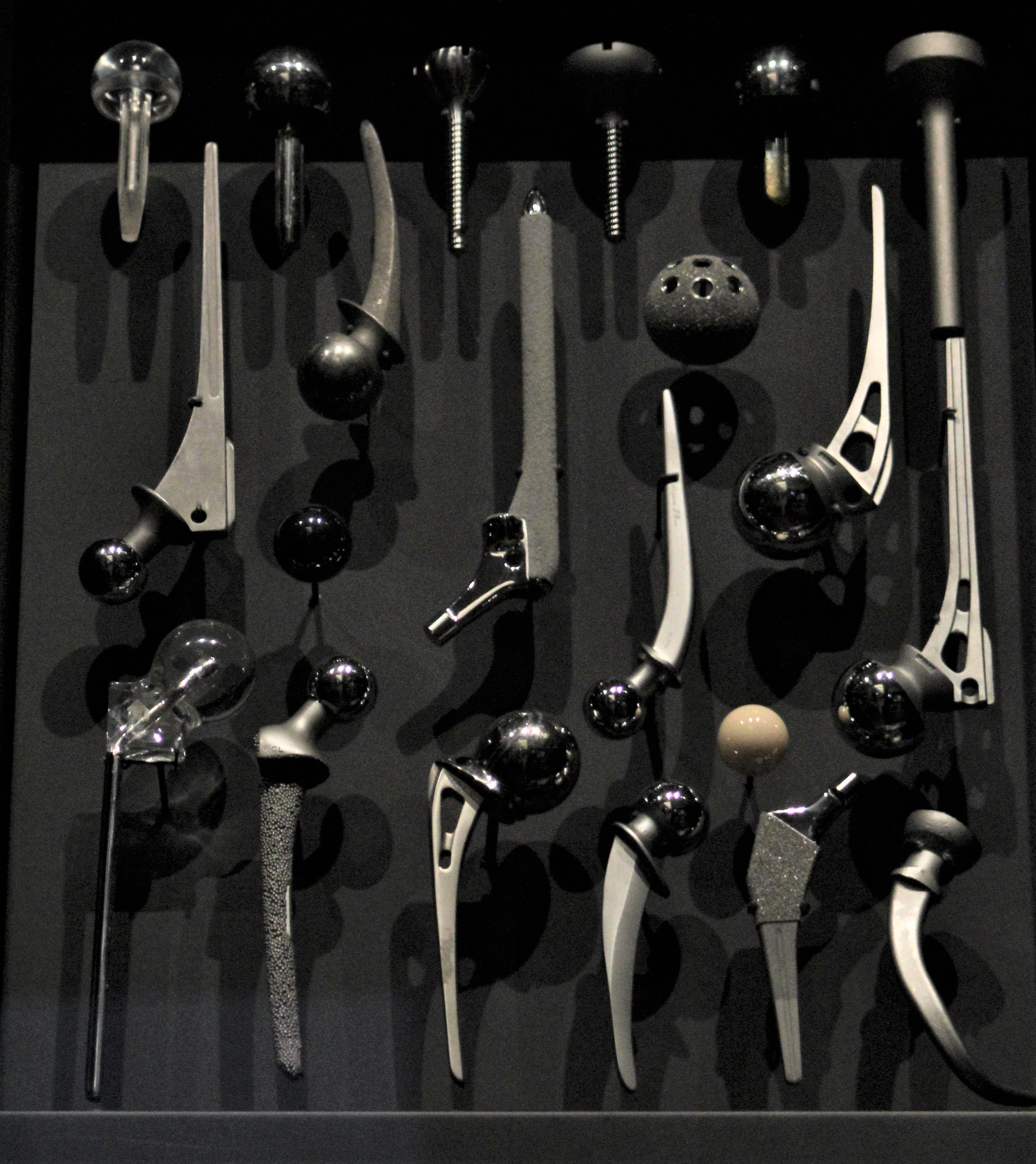
Various hip prostheses on display in the Science Museum, London

The items include:

- Prosthesis from 1960: The "Gosset-style" prosthesis was first introduced in 1949, although the specific example was made by Lusterlite Ltd of Leeds in 1960. It has a perspex "ball" and simple rod-like shaft made of nickel-plated stainless-steel.
- Examples of prostheses from 1970 to 1985: Examples provided by Ipswich Hospital, UK are made of Vitallium (Co/Cr alloy) with curved standard or slender femoral stems. One example has a studded cup.
- Examples of prostheses from the 1990s: Examples, some of which were developed at the Redhill Group of Hospitals and Dorking Hospital, include a ringed titanium hip prosthesis with a screw stem and porous cup, a modular hip prosthesis with a textured femoral stem to aid bone grafting (material unspecified), two Thompson-type prostheses made of Vitallium alloy and an Austin Moore type prosthesis (material unspecified), with a porous metal femoral stem.
- Example of acetabular cup prosthesis from 1998: Example of a prosthetic socket, from Sulzer Orthopedics Inc., is the Inter-Op Hemispherical Shell. This is made from materials not recognised by the human body, so the body's immune system does not attack and reject the joint.
- Examples of prostheses from 2006: Examples made by Smith & Nephew Orthopedics include an "Anthology" titanium prosthesis, which has a flat-tapered stem placed in the thigh bone, and an "Echelon" (cobalt-chrome) prosthesis for both cementless and cemented arthroplasty. Both have porous coating to promote bone adhesion.

The Science Museum's collection also includes specialised surgical tools for hip operations:

- Instrument sets made by Downs Ltd for the City Hospital, Nottingham University Hospitals UK. Tools include head punches, reamers, drills and rasps.
- Prototype oscillating bone saws made by Kenneth Dobbie in the 1960s. Dobbie was electrical engineer at the Royal National Orthopaedic Hospital, Stanmore, UK. He worked closely with the hip surgeon Sir John Charnley to develop the saws eventually leading to a commercial product made by De Soutter Brothers Ltd.

== See also ==
- 2010 DePuy Hip Recall
- Abductor wedge
- Femoroacetabular impingement
- Gruen zone
- Hip examination
