= Vitallium =

Corrosion resistant cobalt-chromium alloy used for biological implants

Vitallium is an alloy of 65% cobalt, 30% chromium, 5% molybdenum, and other substances. The alloy is used in dentistry and artificial joints, because of its resistance to corrosion. It is also used for components of turbochargers because of its thermal resistance. Vitallium was developed by Albert W. Merrick for the Austenal Laboratories in 1932.

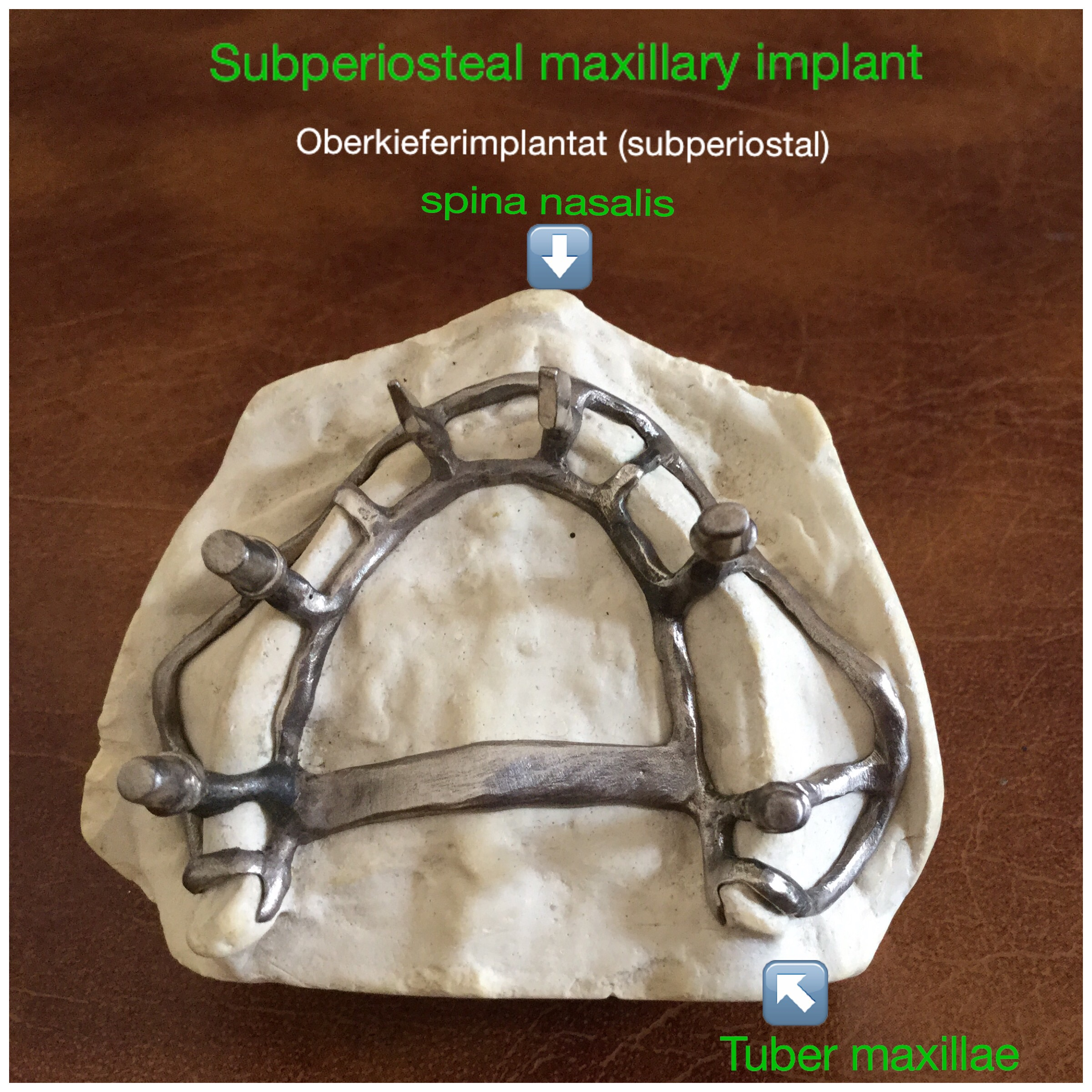
Subperiosteal maxillary implant made of Vitallium 1977

In 2016 Norman Sharp, a 91-year-old British man, was recognised as having the world's oldest hip replacement implants. The two Vitallium implants were implanted in November 1948 at the Royal National Orthopaedic Hospital, under the newly formed NHS. The 67-year-old implants had such an unusually long life, partly because they had not required the typical replacement of such implants, but also because of Sharp's young age of 23 when they were implanted, owing to a childhood case of septic arthritis.

For high-temperature use in engines, particularly turbochargers, the first alloy used was Haynes Stellite No. 21, similar to Vitallium. This was suggested by the British engineer, and denture wearer, S.D. Heron during World War II. Although the characteristics of the material obviously suggested itself for making turbocharger blades, it was thought impossible to cast it to the precision needed. Heron demonstrated that it could be, by showing his Vitallium dentures.
