= Robin Ling =

English surgeon (1927–2017)

Robin Ling MBBCh Doctor of Science OBE
- Born: Robin Sydney Mackwood Ling; 7 September 1927; London
- Died: 9 October 2017 (aged 90)
- Education: Magdalen College, Oxford; St Mary's Hospital, London
- Known for: Invented Exeter hip stem
- Medical career
- Profession: Orthopaedic surgeon
- Sub-specialties: Hip replacement

Robin Sydney Mackwood Ling, OBE (7 September 1927 – 9 October 2017) was an English surgeon who invented the Exeter hip system, a hip replacement. As an orthopaedic surgeon at the Princess Elizabeth orthopaedic hospital, Exeter, he co-operated with an engineer, Dr. Clive Lee from the University of Exeter, to develop a new hip replacement. Their work led to improved quality of life for millions of people.

Ling came from a medical family in Yorkshire, England. He studied medicine in Oxford and London. Becoming a consultant in orthopaedic surgery in Exeter, he performed the first 'Exeter-stem' hip replacement in 1970. His research and observations on the initial operations have resulted in the Exeter hip stem changing from a shiny stem, to matte stem and then back to shiny, with a further change to modular design and being the most popular hip implant in the United Kingdom.

== Early life ==
Robin Ling was born in London on 7 September 1927 and grew up in the town of Keighley, in the West Riding of Yorkshire. His parents and grandfather were doctors. "Old Dr Ling", as his grandfather was known, treated the more prosperous part of the town, whilst his father, "Dr Billy" covered the poorer areas. Dr. Mona Ling, Robin's mother, managed the medical practice during the Second World War.

Ling's early education was at Chelmsford Hall School in Eastbourne. He and his two younger brothers spent World War II in British Columbia where they lived with the Koerners, refugees from the Nazis in Europe, and he attended Shawnigan Lake School on Vancouver Island. After the war, Ling gained admission to the University of Oxford to study medicine, which he completed in 1952 at St Mary's Hospital, London.

== Surgical career ==
After graduating in medicine, Ling began training in orthopaedics in London. By 1961, he had completed training positions in Vancouver and Edinburgh, where, at the Royal Infirmary of Edinburgh and the Princess Margaret Rose Orthopaedic Hospital, Edinburgh, he was appointed consultant. In 1963, Ling became a consultant at the Princess Elizabeth Orthopaedic Hospital in Exeter, where he became interested in hip replacement.

=== The Exeter hip ===
Ling's ambition was to create a hip replacement that could be secured to bony skeleton with acrylic bone cement. Through extensive laboratory analyses of modified hip implants, Ling and engineer Dr Clive Lee built on the work of Sir John Charnley to demonstrate that over a period of time, bone cement can undergo "creep" and act as a thick liquid. This mechanism permits the transmitting weight through the joint to the skeleton and allows patients to remain pain free and active for years.

Ling and Lee, using acrylic bone cement, eventually constructed an implant that could be firmly fixed to the bony skeleton. They proposed a tapered implant profile that would encourage the stem to stay firmly attached to the skeleton for a long period of time. From 1965, together with Lee, Ling worked on replacement arthroscopy at the School of Engineering, University of Exeter. It was here, that the "Exeter hip" was invented. Originally called the "Ling-Lee hip", it was first implanted in 1970 and became the most common artificial hip to be inserted. Unlike previous designs, this hip replacement was inserted through the posterior approach and required just one assistant.

The stem of the Exeter hip was a distinct, polished, tapered and cemented part unlike any former hip prosthesis. Its longstanding success was due to this polished tapered design with its capability to perform like a wedge. It was deliberately not bonded, and therefore free to move at the stem-cement border, and consequently behaved as a self-locking point, successfully and persistently tightening step by step during the life of the hip. For the first five years, the Exeter stem was carefully observed in Exeter only. Around 1975 the stem was being made from a heavier steel and the polished surface was not retained. Appearance and cost had led to a matte rather than polished surface, which caused complications of stem loosening and osteolysis. The Exeter stem returned to the original polished surface by 1986 once these complications were realised. The stem finally changed to a modular system. Ling, as well as Charnley before him, had in the 1980s, made provisional recommendations for a hip replacement registry, opposed by the department of health but later supported by the National Audit Office (United Kingdom) and NICE.

Ling was known for carefully following up his patients. A review of the earliest Exeter hip implants, at 33 years after the first replacements, revealed that 92% did not undergo mechanical loosening. Sir John Charnley himself was also reported to have observed and commended Ling. Copies of the Exeter hip have been marketed by leading manufacturers of artificial hips. Internationally, as well as in the UK, 30 years following the first implant, it was the most implanted cemented hip replacement. By the end of 2010, more than one million operations had been done.

=== Surgical positions ===
Ling acted as president of the British Orthopaedic Research Society between 1979–80 and was president of the British Orthopaedic Association for 1986–7. He was vice-president of the European Orthopaedic Research Society 1989–1991, president of the British Hip Society 1991–93, and president of the International Hip Society 1997–98.

=== Honorary positions ===
In 1986, Ling was appointed honorary professor of bioengineering in the School of Engineering of the University of Exeter. In 1989, he was given an honorary fellowship of the Royal College of Surgeons of Edinburgh followed by the Order of the British Empire in 1992. He was made a fellow of the Australian Orthopaedic Association in 1999 and an honorary fellow of the British Orthopaedic Association in 2000.

== Personal and family life ==
Ling married Mary (née Steedman) in 1955, a casualty nurse from South Africa, whom he met at St Mary's hospital. They had two daughters. He was described as "generous with his time to all surgeons" and "warm and modest".

Ling's love of sailing began during his placement at Shawnighan Lake School on Vancouver Island, British Columbia, Canada. It continued when his parents bought a classic yacht. After moving to the Dart estuary, South Devon, England, on retirement, Ling accomplished his lifelong aspiration of owning his own sailing boat, duly named Enfin.

He died on 9 October 2017 at the age of 90 years.
