= Clive Lee =

British engineer (1939–2021)

Professor Clive Lee
- Born: 18 February 1939; Kings Norton, Birmingham, England
- Died: 2 November 2021 (aged 82)
- Education: University of Nottingham
- Notable work: Co-developer of the Exeter hip system, 1970

Alan John Clive Lee (18 February 1939 – 2 November 2021) was a British design engineer known for co-creating the Exeter hip system in association with orthopaedic surgeon, Robin Ling. Unlike any other hip replacement, the collarless polished tapered cemented hip stem became the most widely used cemented total hip joint in the National Health Service.

== Early life ==
Clive Lee was born in February 1939. He was schooled in Solihull, England. Whilst working as an apprentice for Rolls-Royce, he studied mechanical engineering at the University of Nottingham, subsequently receiving a first class honours degree in 1961.

== Career ==
In 1966, Lee was appointed assistant lecturer at University of Exeter. He went on to become fellow in the School of Engineering, Computing and Mathematics in Exeter. He has published widely in academic British and international journals. In 2020, Lee was made a Professor by the University of Exeter.

"We were proud to name the hip after Exeter as so many people in the University and the hospital were instrumental in its development. We had significant technical and other support from the University's former department of Engineering Science.... Still the biggest pleasure for me is when people who have had replacement hips come up to me and thank me for changing their lives." - quoted by Lee sometime after 2010.

In 2010, the millionth Exeter hip was implanted. It became the most widely used hip replacement worldwide.

== Personal life ==
Lee lived in Exeter with his wife, Pamela. They had two children; a son and a daughter. Both graduated from the University of Nottingham in engineering disciplines. He died on 2 November 2021, at the age of 82.
