= Minimally invasive hip resurfacing =

- Specialty: Orthopedic

Minimally invasive hip resurfacing (MIS) is a total or partial hip surgery that can be carried out through an incision of less than 10 cm (4 inches) without imparting great forces on the anatomy or compromising component positioning.

The modified posterior MIS approach to hip resurfacing and total hip arthroplasty (hip replacement) displays a host of advantages to the patient:

1. Less post-operative pain
2. Less soft tissue damage and pressure on muscle fibres.
3. Shorter hospital stay
4. Lower blood loss
5. Smaller incision
6. Quicker return to work and functional activities

== Technique ==
The process of shortening the operative field (mini-incision) for hip resurfacing from the conventional open approach (15–30 cm), to a mini-incision approach (7–15 cm) has been well documented in the realm of hip surgery. It has been suggested by some surgeons, however, that in doing this one runs the risk of implanting the components incorrectly, especially the acetabular component. It has also noted that during femoral head reaming (drilling of the femoral head) with the surgical site being so small, the conventional instruments can damage the soft tissues.

Having accepted this, the essential criterion for minimally invasive hip resurfacing are:

1. An implant designed for MIS delivery
2. MIS instruments for tissue protection
3. Specialised instrumentation for femoral neck targeting, acetabular reaming, acetabular impaction and retractors that are soft tissue friendly

== History of minimally invasive hip surgery ==
Minimally invasive techniques for total hip arthroplasty (THA, or hip replacement) have been well described by various authors including:

- Richard Berger: "2 incision" technique + fluoroscopy.
- Thomas P.Sculco: posterior approach.
- Innsbruck (Prof.Nolger): Direct anterior.

Some MIS approaches for THA have been largely abandoned by surgeons, most especially Richard Berger's approach.

None of the above approaches offer a fluoroscopy-free approach to Minimal Invasive Hip Resurfacing. The only documented approach for minimally invasive hip resurfacing, having accepted the definition above, is that of Mr.G.S.Chana of the Royal Orthopaedic Hospital, Birmingham, UK. Mr.G.S.Chana, the creator of the MIS reamer handle and the Chana Targeting Device has proved that it is possible to perform hip resurfacing through an incision of 6.5 cm's without macerating the soft tissues and incorrectly implanting the acetabular cup.

== Conventional hip resurfacing today ==
Conventional hip resurfacing techniques were created as an alternative to total hip replacement, whereby only the diseased cartilage and a small surrounding area of the femur are removed, to be replaced with new surfaces. Although hip resurfacing has been around for some 40 years, the contemporary metal on metal bearing hip resurfacing has only increased in popularity amongst surgeons and patients in the past decade. Health-related quality of life measures were markedly improved and patient satisfaction was favorable after hip resurfacing arthroplasty. Hip resurfacing has been welcomed by a number of surgeons globally, but others have met the technique with a certain degree of hesitation due to a number of potential disadvantages:

Hip Resurfacing	Total Hip Replacement
+ Bone preserving	+ Long-term results positive
+ Beneficial to younger, more active patients	+ Less restrictions on patient suitability
+ Better prospects for future revision	+ Comparatively better range of motion
+ Best replicates pre-existing anatomy	Complicated revision process
Larger incision, and higher risk of fracture	Life expectancy of ≥ 30 years post operatively will require revision

Incisions for hip resurfacing (posterior approach) have been well documented to stretch in excess of 20 cm in length. Hip resurfacing has been described as a more complicated procedure in comparison to hip replacement, and the operative technique described by Derek McMinn FRCS Ed, for posterior hip resurfacing shows operative incision similar to the ones mentioned earlier.
