= Femoral neck targeting =

Femoral neck targeting is the process of calculating the centre of the femoral neck during hip resurfacing surgery. This can be done by hand or using electronic aides.

== Early implant failure ==
Studies on metal-on-metal (MoM) hip resurfacings have identified several factors contributing to early implant failure. Key among these are:

1. Incorrect alignment of the implant stem relative to the femoral neck axis.
2. Notching of the femoral neck during the preparation of the femoral head.
3. Exposure of cancellous bone following implantation.

In hip resurfacing surgery, accurately identifying the true centre of the femoral neck in both antero-posterior (AP) and lateral planes is crucial. This reference point is essential for the precise positioning of the femoral neck. Failure to correctly position the femoral component can lead to early implant failure.

== Methods of femoral neck targeting ==
There are many methods surgeons use to calculate the true centre of the femoral neck. Today the methods broadly fall under two categories:

1. Navigational - which can be performed using computer tomography(CT) or fluoroscopy(X-ray).
2. By hand - using various alignment guides/ reference devices/ targeting devices to calculate the true centre of the femoral neck.

The navigational systems were created to be an accurate means for surgeons to implant components with as much accuracy as possible. Studies have shown that this is largely true, but navigational systems are a very different means of femoral neck targeting, and require a steep learning curve. Below is a comparative analysis of both types of navigational targeting against traditional targeting techniques.

CALCULATIONS BY HAND	CT-based	FLUOROSCOPY
+Less operative time needed	+Accurate in producing reproducible quality	+Little additional planning pre-operatively
+Little additional learning curve	+3D feedback of anatomical landmarks	+Accurate in producing reproducible quality
+Smaller, more manageable devices	-More operative time required	-Significant learning curve
+Extensive long-term results available	-Pre-operative planning time-consuming	-More operative time required
-Degrees of error more apparent due to required intra-operative calculations		-Ionizing radiation from X-rays pose potential health risk to patient

A computer-assisted device to calculate the true centre of the femoral neck, without the above disadvantages, has not yet been created. The main issues with the current navigational systems are the levels of extra apparatus required in the operating theatre. In the case of fluoroscopy, a "C-arm" X-ray machine is used, which is a very large piece of apparatus. In the case of CT-based navigation, computer software and training in the use of such software is required, which again adds more apparatus to the operating room.

The popularity of CT and fluoroscopy-based navigation amongst surgeons has been increasing in recent years. The application of these techniques however has been proven to be best suited for different types of surgery. Fluoroscopy-based methods are easier to handle in routine cases with normal anatomy, or cases with lesser deformities. On the other hand, CT-scanning techniques have been better suited to cases of congenital and post-traumatic deformities. It is less suited to routine cases, due to the time-consuming pre-operative procedures e.g. setting up CT-scan, data transfer, planning.

The conventional "by hand" calculations, however are much more popular overall. Most hip resurfacing operative techniques come with some form of guide instrumentation to find the true centre of the femoral neck. These conventional kits will most likely be the instruments that the surgeon will use first, and perhaps become accustomed to. The two most important factors though are

1. Conventional instrumentation is relatively more popular because it is small and hand-held, without the need for large pieces of apparatus.
2. They are relatively cheaper to buy.

All things considered, computer-assisted technology has allowed surgeons to provide accurate femoral neck targeting, and is a viable option for this imperative step to hip resurfacing.

It could be argued that the results of the Adept medial reference jig, first used in 2004 has overcome all of these difficulties; (1) the complete absence of femoral head notching, (2) the complete absence of femoral neck fractures and (3) the outstanding long term results. Likewise, the acetabular introducer has allowed surgeons to implant the socket so much more accurately (as well as being able to check the socket orientation so much more thoroughly) than was ever possible in a BHR;

viz;  National Joint Registry. Implant Summary Report for the ADEPT® Hip Resurfacing (Sizes 48-58 only). November 2018.

Ref: Summary.Report.HP_Head_Adept Resurfacing Head (Sizes 48 - 58 only)_All.22/11/2018.22:08
