= Abduction =

Abduction may refer to:

== Crime ==
- Kidnapping, unlawful confinement of a person against their will
  - Alien abduction, phenomenon of people reporting being kidnapped by extraterrestrial beings
  - Bride kidnapping, a practice in which a man abducts the woman he wishes to marry
  - Child abduction, unauthorized removal of a minor from the custody of their guardian(s)
    - International child abduction, form of human trafficking
  - Express kidnapping, abduction where a small immediate ransom is demanded
  - Raptio, large-scale abduction of women
  - Tiger kidnapping, taking a hostage to force a loved one or associate of the victim to do something

== Media ==
=== Film and television ===
- Abduction (1975 film), directed by Joseph Zito
- Abduction (1997 film), directed by Takao Okawara
- Abduction (2011 film), directed by John Singleton
- Abduction (2019 film), directed by Ernie Barbarash
- Abduction: The Megumi Yokota Story, a 2005 American documentary film
- The Abduction, a 1996 TV movie starring Victoria Principal and Robert Hays
- "Abduction" (The Outer Limits), a 2001 television episode
- "Abduction" (Shameless), a 2004 television episode
- "Abduction", a 2007 episode of Death Note
- "Abductions", a 2002 episode of Totally Spies!
- "The Abduction" (Alias), a 2002 television episode
- "The Abduction" (Dr. Quinn, Medicine Woman), a 1994 television episode

=== Literature ===
- Abduction (novel), 2000, by Robin Cook
- Abduction!, a 2004 novel by Peg Kehret
- The Abduction (Norwegian title Bortførelsen), a 1987 novel by Mette Newth
- The Abduction, a 1998 novel by J. Robert King

=== Music ===
- "Abduction", a 2005 song by Iron Maiden vocalist Bruce Dickinson, from the album Tyranny of Souls
- Abduction, a music label run by members of Sun City Girls

== Science ==
- Abduction (anatomy), a type of movement that draws a structure or limb away from the median plane of the body
- Abductive reasoning, a method of reasoning in logic

== Other uses ==
- Abduction (card game), published in 1998

== See also ==
- Abducted (disambiguation)
- Abductor (disambiguation)
