= Abductor muscle =

Abductor muscle refers to any muscle that causes abduction and may refer to:

- Abductor digiti minimi muscle of hand
- Abductor digiti minimi muscle of foot
- Abductor hallucis muscle
- Abductor pollicis brevis muscle
- Abductor pollicis longus muscle

== See also ==
- List of abductors of the human body
