= Periprosthetic =

Periprosthetic in medicine refers to a structure in close relation to an implant.

Clinically it can refer to:

- Bone fracture or 'periprosthetic fracture' around an artificial joint, e.g. after a knee replacement
- infection around an artificial joint or 'periprosthetic joint infection'
- Vegetation or leak around an artificial heart valve
