= Abductor wedge =

Medical aid

An abductor wedge is designed to separate the legs of a patient. It is often used after hip surgery to prevent the new hip from "popping out".

It can also be used to support the legs of an individual with spinal cord injury or severe physical or neurological disabilities in abduction (legs apart position) while seated in a wheelchair.
