= Foreign body reaction =

Bodily response to the presence of a foreign object

Foreign body granuloma
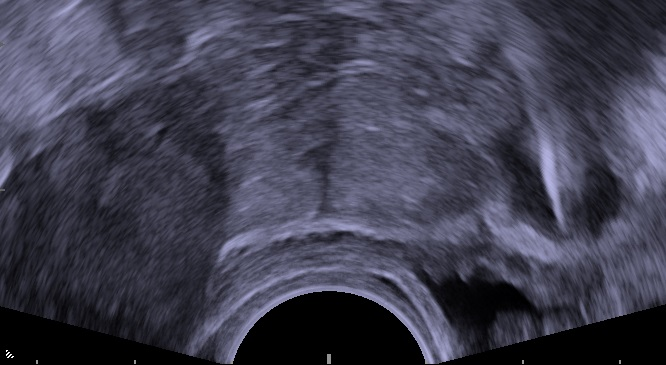
- Transvaginal ultrasonography showing a foreign body granuloma at right as a hypoechoic (dark) area around a perforated intrauterine device. The uterus is at left.
- Specialty: Dermatology

A foreign body reaction (FBR) is a typical tissue response to a foreign body within biological tissue. It usually includes the formation of a foreign body granuloma. Tissue encapsulation of an implant is an example, as is inflammation around a splinter. Foreign body granuloma formation consists of protein adsorption, macrophages, multinucleated foreign body giant cells (macrophage fusion), fibroblasts, and angiogenesis. It has also been proposed that the mechanical property of the interface between an implant and its surrounding tissues is critical for the host response.

In the long term, the foreign body reaction results in encapsulation of the foreign body within a calcified shell. For example, a lithopedion is a rare phenomenon which occurs most commonly when a fetus dies during an abdominal pregnancy, is too large to be reabsorbed by the body, and calcifies.

== Foreign body reaction to biomaterial implantation ==
Following biomaterial implantation, blood and body fluids contact the implant surface. Host blood proteins adsorb onto the implant surface and a fibrin matrix forms. Acute and chronic inflammation follow the initial blood protein deposition and matrix formation. Macrophages at the implant site fuse to form foreign body giant cells. Following the inflammatory response, granulation tissue form. The end stage of the foreign body reaction is the fibrous capsule formation around the implanted biomaterial. The biocompatibility of the device affects the severity of the foreign body reaction. The foreign body reaction can lead to device failure.

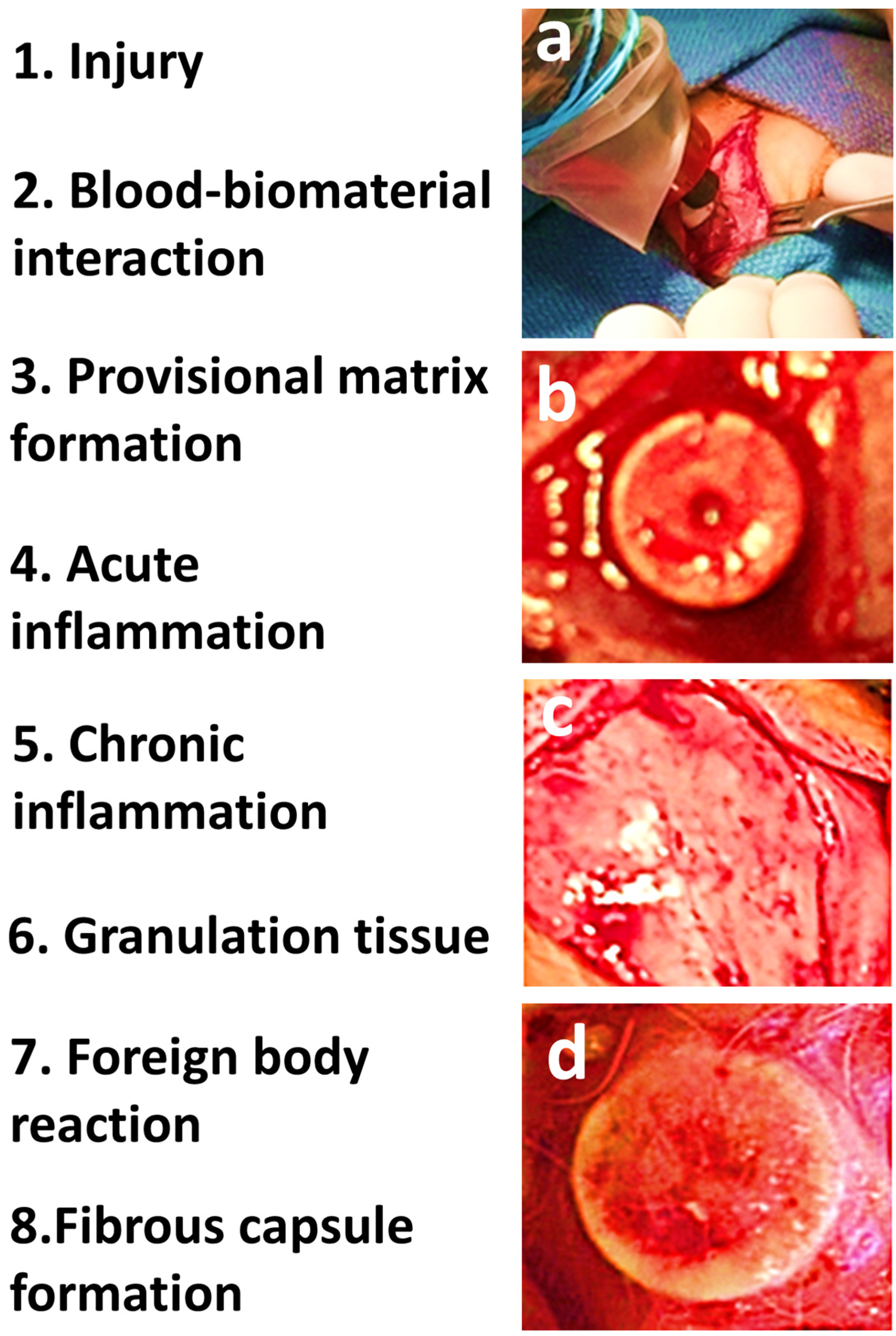
Protein adsorption on the surface of the implant attracts immune cells that ultimately result in the fibrous encapsulation of the implant.

=== Protein adsorption ===
During blood-biomaterial interaction, blood proteins spontaneously adsorb to the biomaterial surface. The biomaterial surface properties affect the types, concentrations, and conformation of proteins that adsorb to the surface. The Vroman effect can describe the time-dependent behavior of this protein adsorption. Surface-adsorbed proteins regulate inflammatory cell interaction and adhesion. The deposited proteins allow inflammatory cells to attach via integrins. The biomaterial surface can also recruit and activate complement proteins.

=== Immune recruitment ===
The composition and conformation of adsorbed proteins on the implant surface is critical to the foreign body reaction. For the first two days, neutrophils are the primary cell type that deposit on the implant surface. Neutrophils release degradative enzymes and reactive oxygen intermediates that damages the implant. Platelets from the blood-biomaterial interaction release inflammatory cytokines that cause monocytes and macrophages to extravasate and migrate to the implant site. The degranulation and release of histamine from mast cells further recruits macrophages to the biomaterial. Macrophages adhere to the biomaterial surface based on the surface protein deposits and produce cytokines that further recruit macrophages. Foreign body granuloma forms as immune cells accumulate on the biomaterial surface in an attempt to eliminate the biomaterial.

=== Macrophage fusion ===
Adherent macrophages at the implant site can fuse into a multinucleated cell called foreign body giant cell. Foreign body giant cell formation depends on the biomaterial surface properties and on the presence of interleukin-4 and interleukin-13. Foreign body giant cells release reactive oxygen intermediates, degradative enzymes, and acid onto the biomaterial surface. Foreign body giant cells also attempt to engulf the biomaterial for degradation. Adherent macrophages and foreign body giant cells degrade biomaterials and can lead to device failure. Foreign body giant cells remain on the surface of the implanted device throughout the device's lifetime.

=== Fibrous capsule formation ===
The end-stage healing response is the fibrous encapsulation of the biomaterial. Macrophages and foreign body giant cells release cytokines that attract fibroblasts. Fibroblasts create a collagenous fibrous capsule to separate the biomaterial from the surrounding tissue. The fibrous capsule may hinder the device's function, such as drug diffusion for drug delivery systems or normal tissue regeneration for tissue engineering implants.

== Engineering biomaterial to resist the foreign body reaction ==
The foreign body giant cell formation and the fibrous encapsulation of the implanted device can affect the function of the implanted device and lead to its failure. Reducing the foreign body reaction can promote better device performance and durability. Even though many types of implants cannot completely escape the foreign body reaction, there are many ways to engineer biomaterials to reduce the foreign body reaction. Reducing nonspecific protein adsorption is one important method to prevent fibrous encapsulation of the implant.

=== Modification of physical properties ===
The physical properties of the implant's surface, such as size, shape, topology, and strength, influence protein adsorption and immune cell interactions with the implant. Generally, surface roughness induces greater protein adsorption and triggers greater immune response. Thicker cylindrical implants on the millimeter scale were shown to produce greater fibrous encapsulation. However, there may not be an absolute relationship between the modification of the biomaterial and the associated foreign body response, because some biomaterials intrinsically induce a stronger foreign body response than other biomaterials would.

=== Delivery of anti-inflammatory drugs ===
Implanted biomaterial can be loaded with different drugs to perform anti-inflammatory functions or promote angiogenesis to further integrate the implant with the host. The sustained release of certain anti-inflammatory drugs from the biomaterial, such as dexamethasone, is shown to increase implant life by preventing inflammation and fibrosis.

=== Incorporation of bioactive molecules ===
Coating the implant surface with biomimetic biomaterial may reduce the foreign body reaction and reduce the device failure rate. Biomaterials that mimic the extracellular matrix can significantly reduce the inflammatory response as well as reduce foreign body giant cell formation.

=== Novel biomaterials ===
Developing materials that resist protein adsorption, fibrous encapsulation, or foreign body giant cell formation is important to resist the foreign body reaction. Commonly used biomaterials like polyethylene glycol and polyhydroxyethylmethacrylate resist nonspecific protein adsorption but are easily degraded in the in vivo oxidative environment. Therefore, scientists are looking for new materials that intrinsically resist the foreign body reaction.

==== Zwitterionic materials ====
Zwitterionic polymers are widely used in surface modification because they can inhibit non-specific protein adhesion. Zwitterionic hydrogels also promote angiogenesis in surrounding tissues. Commonly used zwitterionic materials include sulfobetaine, carboxybetaine, and phosphorylcholine.

Zwitterionic polymers have the ability to reduce nonspecific adsorption of proteins and cells at biological interfaces. Zwitterionic coatings are often used to minimize the negative effects of foreign body response for implanted devices and improve the device's biocompatibility. The mechanism is related to surface charge balancing and creation of a strong hydration sphere.

Zwitterionic coatings can be covalently attached by "grafting to" and "grafting from" methods. With "grafting to" methods, the surface is modified with the polymer after synthesis, whereas with "grafting from" methods, polymer is directly synthesized on a modified surface.

Several "grafting to" methods have been used to covalently attach zwitterionic polymers to surfaces. Anderson group developed attachment to the surface via polydopamine conjugation. In this case, copolymer should contain a thiol group. Nazarova and coworkers synthesized MPC copolymers with 2-methacrylamido-D-glucose, N-vinylpyrrolidone, and N-vinyl-N-methyl-acetamide and grafted them onto the surface of carbon fibre biosorbent using γ-radiation. MPC copolymers with trimethoxysilylpropyl methacrylate can be thermally cured and self-crosslinked.

==== Modian field alginates ====
Alginates are widely used for their low cost, low toxicity, and tunability. However, implantation of only alginate will trigger serious foreign body reaction. There are a few triazole-containing alginate derivative microspheres that remain clear of fibrotic deposition in mice, but more studies are required to explore the relationship between triazole groups and the inflammatory response.

==== Polypeptide materials ====
Polyethylene glycol peptides and zwitterionic peptides have immunomodulatory functions that help to resist the foreign body reaction.

== Gallery ==
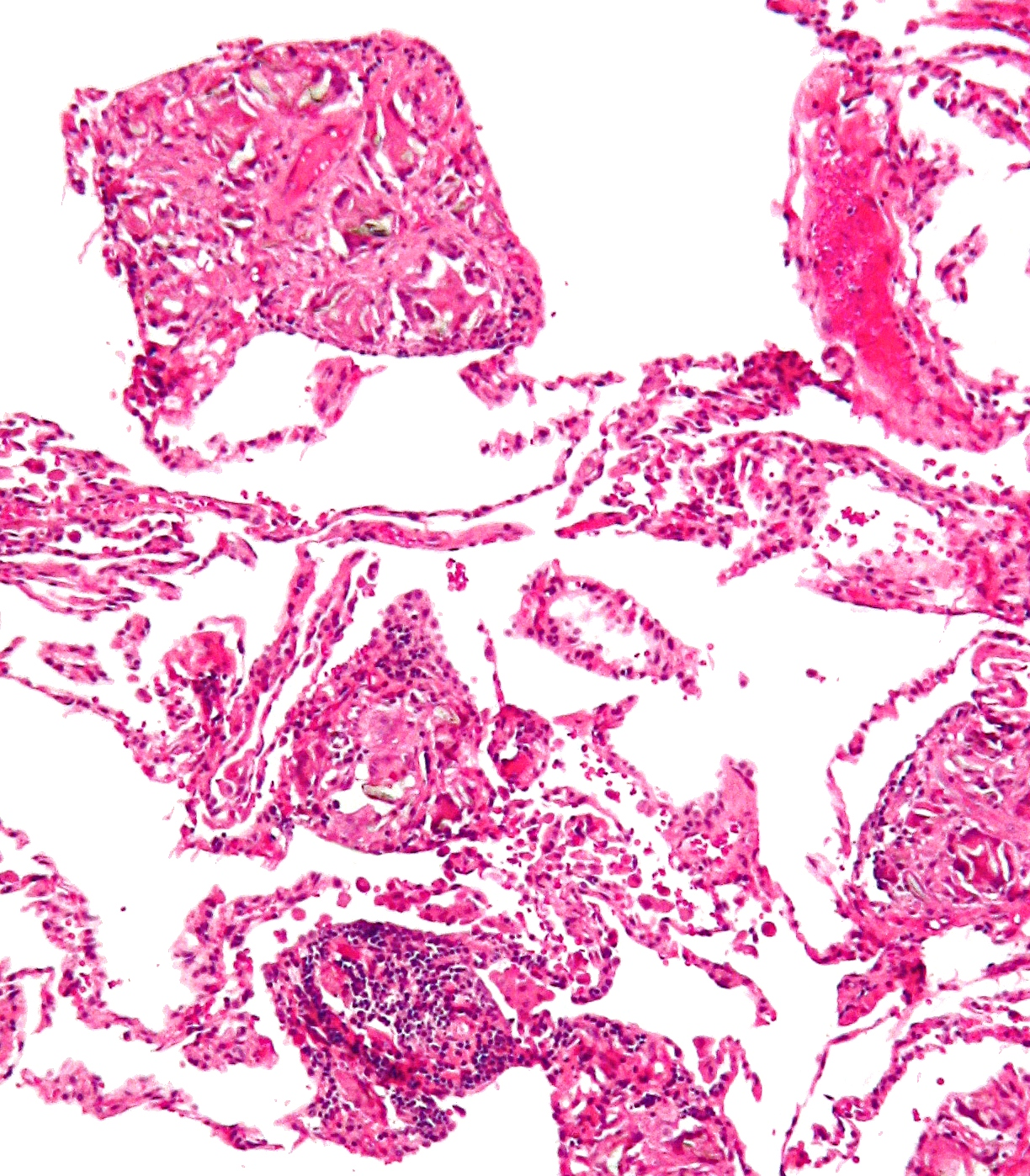
A foreign-body response to talc (talcosis) due to intravenous drug use. H&E stain.

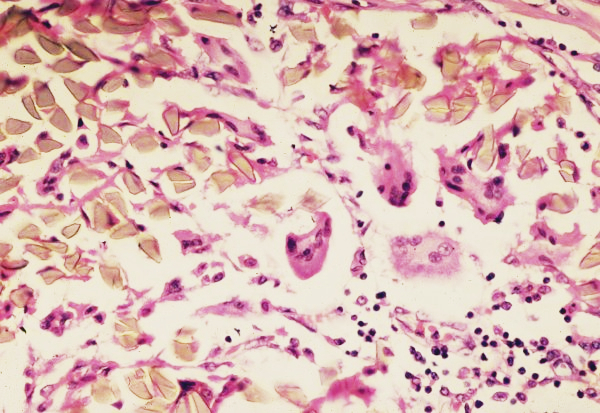
Foreign body giant cell reaction to nylon suture material

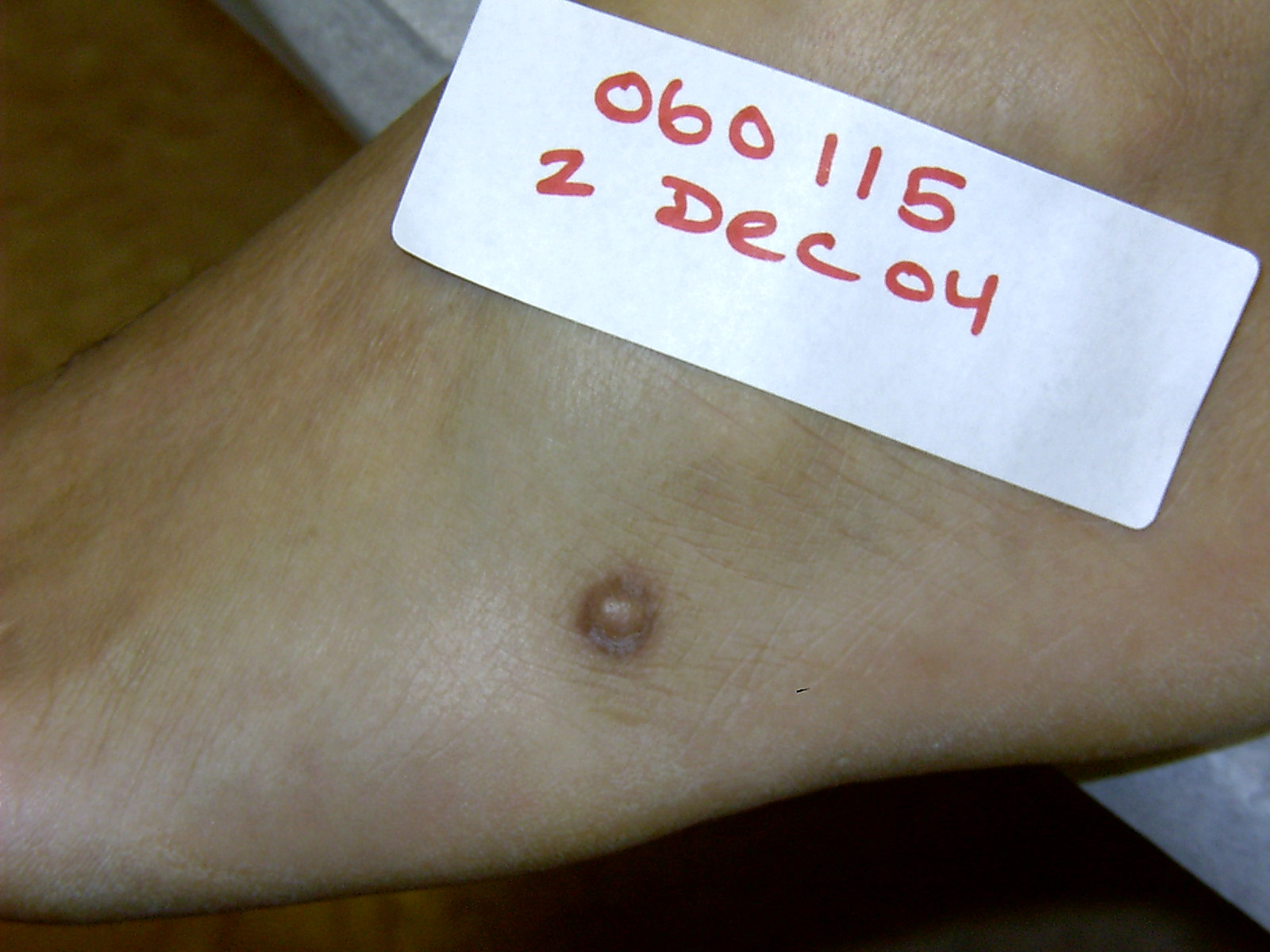
Foreign body granuloma

== See also ==
- Foreign body
- List of cutaneous conditions
