= Australian Orthopaedic Association =

Australian Orthopaedic Association (AOA)
- Founded: 1936
- Members: 1800+
- President: Annette Holian
- Website: http://www.aoa.org.au

The Australian Orthopaedic Association (AOA) is a not for profit organisation that represents over 1800 Australian orthopaedic surgeons.

== History ==
The association was formed over several meetings in 1936. At the first, 6 October 1936, a subcommittee was created to draft a constitution. At a meeting on 27 April 1937, foundation members were officially declared and Edmund Vance was elected president. The draft constitution was amended and adopted.

On 10 November 2021 at the conclusion of AOA's 81st Annual General Meeting, Annette Holian was made the association's first female president in its 85-year history.

== Structure and Governance ==
AOA's Board of Directors, which governs the Association, is elected by its Fellows. The Board appoints a Chief Executive Officer, who implements strategy and manages the operations of the organisation.

One current focus of the efforts of the administration (represented by CEO Adrian Cosenza) and leadership (represented by AOA President Annette Holian) is a deep commitment to "encouraging ethical practices and driving cultural change" with regard to interactions between surgical professionals and medical industry bodies, as recognised by their invitation to attend consecutive Asia-Pacific Economic Cooperation (APEC) summits.

== Activities ==
AOA provides orthopaedic surgeons and trainees with specialist education, training and continuing professional development (CPD). They provide information and advice to the public relating to musculoskeletal conditions and treatment, and support scientific research relating to orthopaedic surgery. They also participate and organise humanitarian programs in Australia and internationally.

== AOA National Joint Replacement Registry ==
The Australian Orthopaedic Association National Joint Replacement Registry (AOANJRR) monitors the performance of joint replacement operations across Australia. The Registry began collecting data in limited states in September 1999, and a state-by-state introduction saw national coverage achieved in 2002. All public and private hospitals at which arthroplasty is performed voluntarily submit data concerning operations, and verification processes have established that information is submitted to the Registry on more than 99% of such operations.

One of the aims of the Registry is to enable the identification of medical devices and implants requiring higher-than-anticipated rates of revision. Such identification through Registry data can lead to prostheses being withdrawn from the market. When investigations by the Therapeutic Goods Administration (TGA) results in regulatory action, surgeons who use the implants in question are notified of outcomes.

== Orthopaedic Outreach ==
AOA has strong ties with, and provides significant support to, Orthopaedic Outreach, a charitable organisation through which Australian orthopaedic surgeons travel to poor regions of the Asia Pacific to provide free operations and care to impoverished members of societies in which appropriate surgical care is either unattainable or non-existent. Orthopaedic Outreach has been identified as the "volunteer service arm of the Australian Orthopaedic Association" by Associate Professor Graham Gumley, Orthopaedic Outreach Chair, and the vast majority of the surgeons who volunteer through the service are AOA members.

== See also ==
- British Orthopaedic Association
- American Academy of Orthopaedic Surgeons
