= Micron Products =

- Company type: Public
- Traded as: NYSE: MICR
- Industry: Plastics, Manufacturing
- Founded: 1978
- Headquarters: Fitchburg, Massachusetts
- Services: Precision machining, plastic injection molding
- Website: www.micronproducts.com

Founded in 1978, Micron Products, Inc. is a contract manufacturing organization with an emphasis on precision machining and plastic injection molding.

Micron Products is a wholly owned subsidiary of Micron Solutions Inc. (NYSE MKT:MICR). Prior to March 24, 2017, Micron Solutions was known as Arrhythmia Research Technology (NYSE MKT:HRT); it was rebranded to better align with Micron Products.

== Noteworthy Markets ==
Micron Products develops medical implants and orthopedic replacement parts.

Micron Products also specializes in defense components, like blunt impact projectiles. These less-lethal projectiles created for Security Devices International (SDI) are used by police and military groups worldwide, including the Israeli Army, the Los Angeles SWAT Team, and the Royal Canadian Mounted Police. Unlike traditional ammunition, these 40-millimeter projectiles do not penetrate skin, but hit a human target with enough force to cause pain without lasting injury.
