= Drug-eluting implant =

Implant for delivering a drug

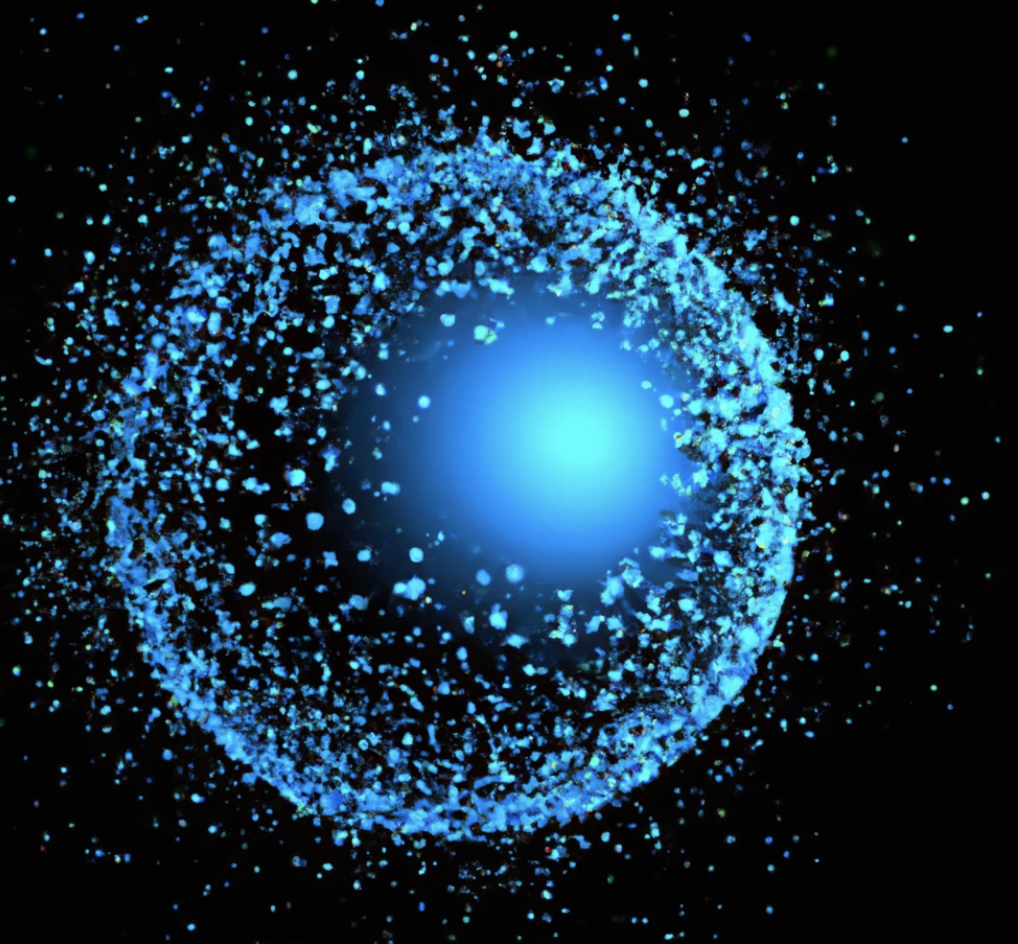
Polymer implant eluting drugs

Drug eluting implants encompass a wide range of bioactive implants that can be placed in or near a tissue to provide a controlled, sustained or on demand release of drug while overcoming barriers associated with traditional oral and intravenous drug administration, such as limited bioavailability, metabolism, and toxicity. These implants can be used to treat location-specific and surrounding illness and commonly use 3D printing technologies to achieve individualized implants for patients.

The production of drug eluting implants has grown significantly in the last decade and continues to be an area of research due to their flexible nature that can be utilised for the treatment of a multitude of medical conditions. These implants can be loaded with a variety of different drug types such as antibiotics, antivirals, chemotherapy, growth factors and anti-inflammatory drugs.

Drug eluting implants can provide a versatile method of drug delivery that can be personalized and targeted to treat a variety of medical conditions and overcome issues such as drug bioavailability, metabolism and dosage associated with traditional drug delivery systems.

== Applications ==
Drug eluting implants can be used in the management and treatment of a variety of medical conditions. Traditional drug delivery methods have potential disadvantages that have led to the development of different drug delivery techniques across most body systems, many of which can improve treatment efficacy.

=== Cardiovascular ===
Drug-eluting stents and balloons are a common therapeutic method in the management and treatment of cardiovascular disease that to open and maintain arteries while delivering drug locally to an area of a vessel.

=== Gynecology ===
Common gynecological implants that elute contraceptive medication can be inserted subcutaneously or into the uterus. Non-invasive drug eluting ring implants that can be inserted into the vagina and release therapeutic doses of contraceptive, anti-inflammatory and antibiotic drugs to increase compliance of contraceptive therapeutics are under development.

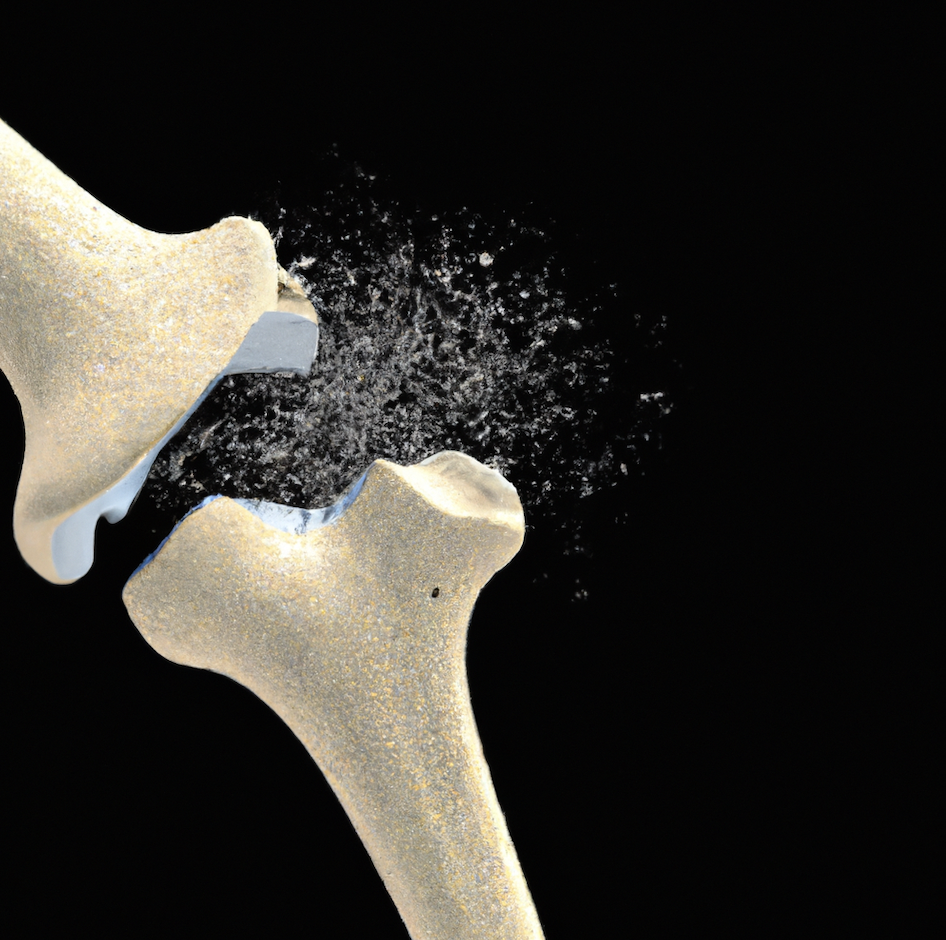
3-D rendering of a bone joint with a drug eluting coating.

=== Orthopedics ===
The treatment of orthopedic conditions has proved to be a large target area for drug eluting implants. Current uses for this method drug delivery include bone and joint implants that can release drugs at the joint replacement sites to prevent infection and anti-inflammatory responses.

Other potential treatments using this method of drug delivery in orthopedic medicine include drug eluting implants that aid in the regeneration of bone at implantation sites while reducing microbial growth.

=== Oncology ===
Current treatment for oncological conditions include chemotherapy, radiation and surgery. Drug eluting implants have shown potential in the treatment of cancer through adjuvant chemotherapy that has shown to suppress tumor formation locally, overcoming side effects associated with systemic chemotherapy treatment and reduce the need for surgical resection of cancerous tumors.

=== Ophthalmology ===
Intravitreal administration of therapeutic drug doses is commonly done via injection or implant. Drug eluting contact lenses and implants can deliver targeted and extended doses of drug to the retina without the need for injection.

=== Dermatology ===
Drug eluting sutures can produce a prolonged local release of anaesthetic as well as heal wounds. This has the potential to limit the need for postoperative opioid analgesics that can cause addiction.

== Design ==
Drug eluting implants are designed to be implanted into location specific tissues and release drug locally. These implants are made using biocompatible materials that will not elicit an immune response.

The structure of the implant is individualized and designed to conform to the shape of the tissue that is being treated. The implant contains a reservoir that elutes a drug dependent on the mechanism of release. This mechanism be in the form of a matrix coating of the implant or a reservoir within the implant. Designs aim to provide therapeutic dosage to the target tissue while reducing negative side effects and maximizing efficacy.

== Development and Manufacturing ==
There are a variety of methods used in the manufacturing of drug eluting implants, most of which utilize 3D printing technology. Techniques are dependent on factors such as the condition being managed, the drug being released and the individual patient being treated.

=== 3D Printing ===
3D printing involves the production of a 3-dimensional object through the layering of material. There are a variety of 3D printing techniques, all of which come with their own advantages and disadvantages which should be considered when creating an individualized implant. The production of these drug eluting implants through 3D printing is currently being investigated to determine drug delivery properties and efficacy to improve individualized medicinal devices.

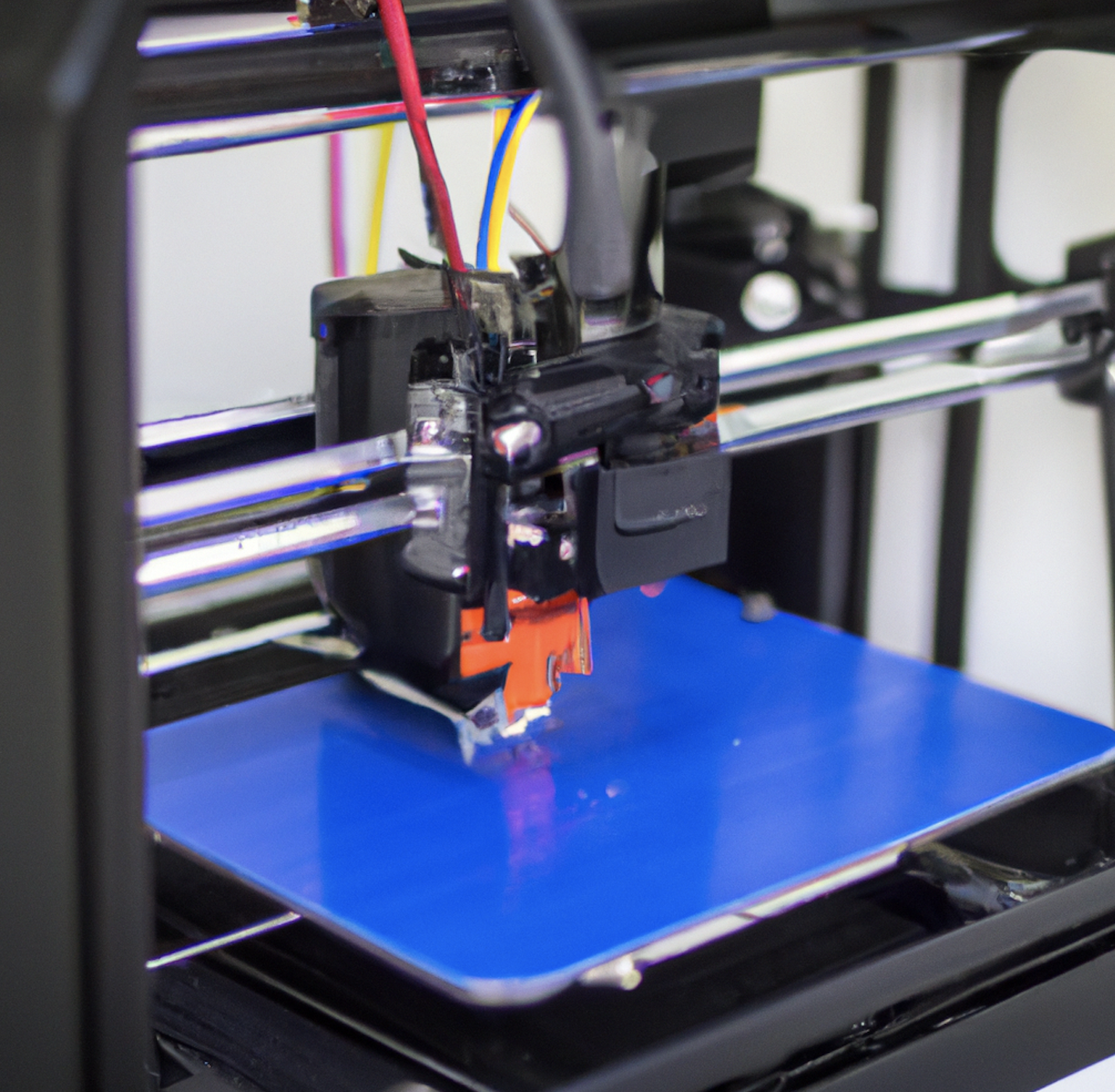
Inkjet 3-D printer used for production of drug-eluting implants

Traditional bio-printing technologies used in the field of biomedical engineering include inkjet-based systems, extrusion-based systems, and laser-assisted systems that can be used to create highly specific and individual implants for patients.

== Materials ==
The most common materials used to create drug eluting implants include highly versatile polymers, ceramics, and metals, all with varying kinetics that can be manipulated to produce the desired drug delivery effect.

=== Polymers ===
Polymers and polymer networks are among the most widely used materials in drug eluting implants. These implants are classified as either degradable and able to be broken down and metabolized by the body, or non-degradable which eventually require removal.

Common degradable polymer materials used in drug eluting implants include poly e-caprolactone (PCL), polylactic-co-glycolic acid (PLGA) and poly-L-lactic acid (PLLA), while non-degradable polymer materials include silicones commonly used in plastic surgery, urethanes and acrylates, and are more likely to be used in the treatment of chronic conditions in which long term implantation is to be expected.

Polymers can be used to create monolithic drug delivery systems in which a drug is released in a rate-controlled polymer matrix, reservoir drug delivery systems containing a drug-filled core that releases drug in a manner dependent on the surrounding polymer, and hydrogels that can release drugs controlled by a variety of stimuli including ultrasound, temperature, and pH changes.

=== Ceramics ===
In relation to biomedical implant manufacturing, the term 'ceramic' can be used to encompass a wide variety of non-metallic substances that can be utilised in drug eluting implants due to their biocompatible properties such as resistance to corrosion and shear, low electrical conductance ability, and high melting temperatures.

Ceramic implants can be classified as bio-inert and include materials such as aluminum, zirconia, and certain carbon and silicon derivatives which are not biodegradable. Bioactive ceramic implants are biodegradable substances that include calcium phosphates, and a variety of oxidised minerals that mimic natural bone properties. Ceramic drug eluting implants are therefore commonly used in hard tissue replacement surgeries such as bone.

=== Metals ===
Metals such as titanium are highly biocompatible and therefore commonly used in osteopathic medicine in the manufacturing of artificial joints. These joints are often coated in polymeric, or ceramic material embedded with drugs for prevention of infection and rejection, and to reduce inflammatory responses that are common among joint implants.

Metals however are susceptible to erosion and infection and lack biological activity. When metals are used as an implant as opposed to a permanent mechanical fixture, problems can arise when contacting associated bone and releasing drug to target tissues such as static stresses that can lead to bone loss at the site of implantation.

== Drug Loading ==
The idea of a drug eluting implant is to overcome many of the obstacles associated with traditional drug therapies, as well as reducing the need for potentially invasive procedures, including those involved in the removal of embedded drug eluting implants.

The loading of a drug onto a matrix can be either incorporated into the drug at the time of manufacture or performed after the printing of an implant is complete. Drugs integrated at the point of manufacture through blending with polymeric materials are generally able to withstand preparation conditions which can exclude many sensitive drugs from this mechanism. Therefore, loading after manufacture is considered to be an easier method.

Normally, once drug is loaded into a delivery system, there is no non-invasive way to refill once drug levels in the system are depleted. Developments in drug delivery refilling have shown potential through chemically modified drug-loaded hydrogels that, once in the body, are able to translocate to a specific local drug delivery depot as a non-invasive means of refilling.

== Advantages ==
Drug eluting implants aim to improve efficacy of drug delivery by overcoming issues commonly associated with traditional systemic administration of drugs such as metabolism, toxicity, and an inability to maintain a certain concentration of drug in the circulation. To overcome these issues, patients are usually administered higher doses of drugs in a controlled and clinical setting.

The introduction of a drug eluting implant to a local tissue can provide targeted and sustained dosing of drug and prevent systemic metabolism, a common obstacle seen in orally delivered medications. This can reduce dosage which can in turn reduce treatment cost. Lower drug concentrations delivered via local depots can therefore lower the risk of toxicity as well as increasing compliance and reducing physician/patient burden to manage appropriate drug concentrations.

Drug eluting implants also provide an effective mechanism for bypassing the blood-brain barrier, and this method of drug delivery is primarily used in the treatment of glial tumors.

== Limitations ==
There are issues that can arise with the local and targeted method of drug eluting implants. One of the largest obstacles that the field of drug eluting implants faces is the mechanism of drug loading and reloading of non-biodegradable implants. The development of drugs that can travel from systemic circulation to a specific depot could prove a useful way to overcome the need for invasive refilling and re-implantation.

Foreign bodies implanted into the body can elicit immune responses. Medically implanted drug eluting devices can induce an inflammatory response as well as being rejected by the body which can cause chronic inflammation. Anti-inflammatory drugs can be administered alongside the implantation of a drug eluting device to prevent chronic inflammation and systemic immune side effects that this may induce.

== Future of drug eluting implants ==
The field of drug eluting implants is expanding to encompass treatment and management methods for a variety of treatments. In the future, possibilities exist to manufacture 'smart' drug eluting implants fitted with sensors that can provide feedback-controlled drug delivery in patients suffering from abnormalities such as diabetes, or for patients that experience seizures and require prophylactic treatment.

The development of novel drug eluting implant materials and mechanisms has the potential for improving patient safety, comfort, compliance and thus acting on global health challenges such as chronic diseases, infectious and non-infectious diseases, and contraception.
