= Leo Vroman =

Dutch poet

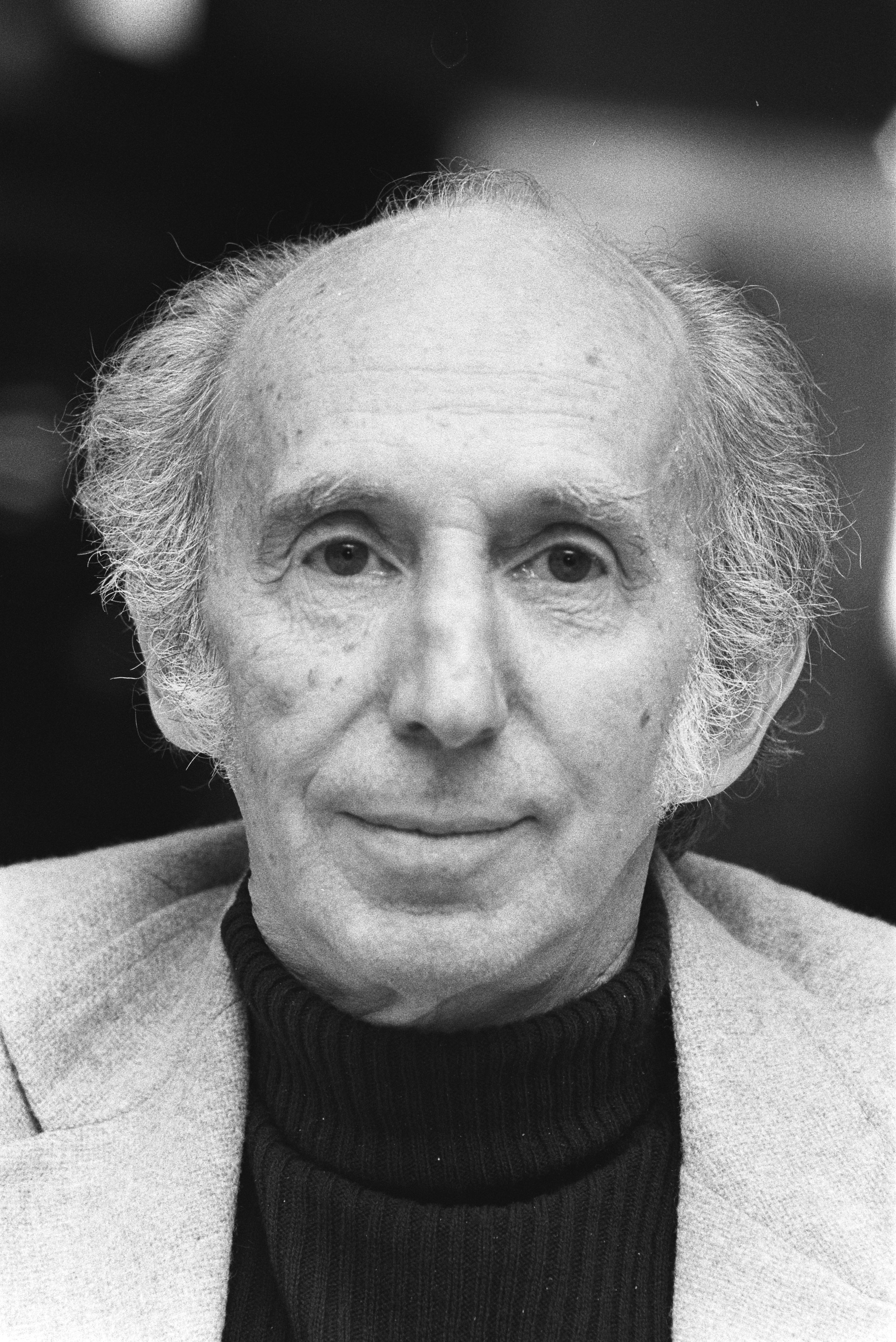
- Leo Vroman in 1983
- Born: April 10, 1915; Gouda, Netherlands
- Died: February 22, 2014 (aged 98); Fort Worth, Texas, United States
- Education: Utrecht University (PhD in Physiology)
- Occupations: Hematologist, poet, illustrator
- Notable work: The Vroman Effect
- Spouse: Georgine Marie Sanders (m. 1947)
- Children: 2
- Awards: Multiple Dutch literary poetry awards, Wayne State University Individual Science Award (1970)

Leo Vroman (April 10, 1915 – February 22, 2014) was a Dutch-American hematologist, a prolific poet mainly in Dutch and an illustrator.

== Life and work ==
Vroman, who was Jewish, was born in Gouda and studied biology in Utrecht. When the Nazis occupied the Netherlands on May 10, 1940, he fled to London, and from there he traveled to the Dutch East Indies. He finished his studies in Batavia. After the Japanese occupied Indonesia he was interned and stayed in several prisoner-of-war camps. In the camp Tjimahi he befriended the authors Tjalie Robinson and Rob Nieuwenhuys.

His uncle was the physician and medical researcher Isidore Snapper, who worked in New York City after emigrating from the Netherlands. (The mathematician Ernst Snapper was Vroman's cousin.) After the war, Vroman went to the United States to work in New York as a hematology researcher. He gained American citizenship and lived in Fort Worth until his death in 2014, aged 98.

In 1946, he published his first poems in the Netherlands, and since then has won almost every Dutch literary poetry prize possible. In 1970 Vroman was awarded the Individual Science Award by Wayne State University in Detroit, Michigan. In 2003, his former high school, de Goudse ScholenGemeenschap (GSG), changed its name into de Goudse ScholenGemeenschap Leo Vroman (GSG Leo Vroman).

He was engaged to Georgine Marie Sanders from May 1940 until their marriage in September 1947. They had two daughters.

Dr. Vroman's list of accomplishments include winning nearly every Dutch literary award for poetry; having illustrations and drawings that hang in Dutch museums; a scientific output that includes 69 research papers, many of them published in Elsevier journals; and a discovery named after him: the Vroman Effect. He has also published 60 books, 40 of them on poetry. ...
In the US, Vroman worked as a researcher at various institutes, including the American Museum of Natural History, The Mount Sinai Hospital in New York, the US Department of Veterans Affairs hospital in Brooklyn, and Columbia University. While at Mount Sinai, he conducted research that enabled him to receive his PhD in physiology from Utrecht University.

== Poetry ==
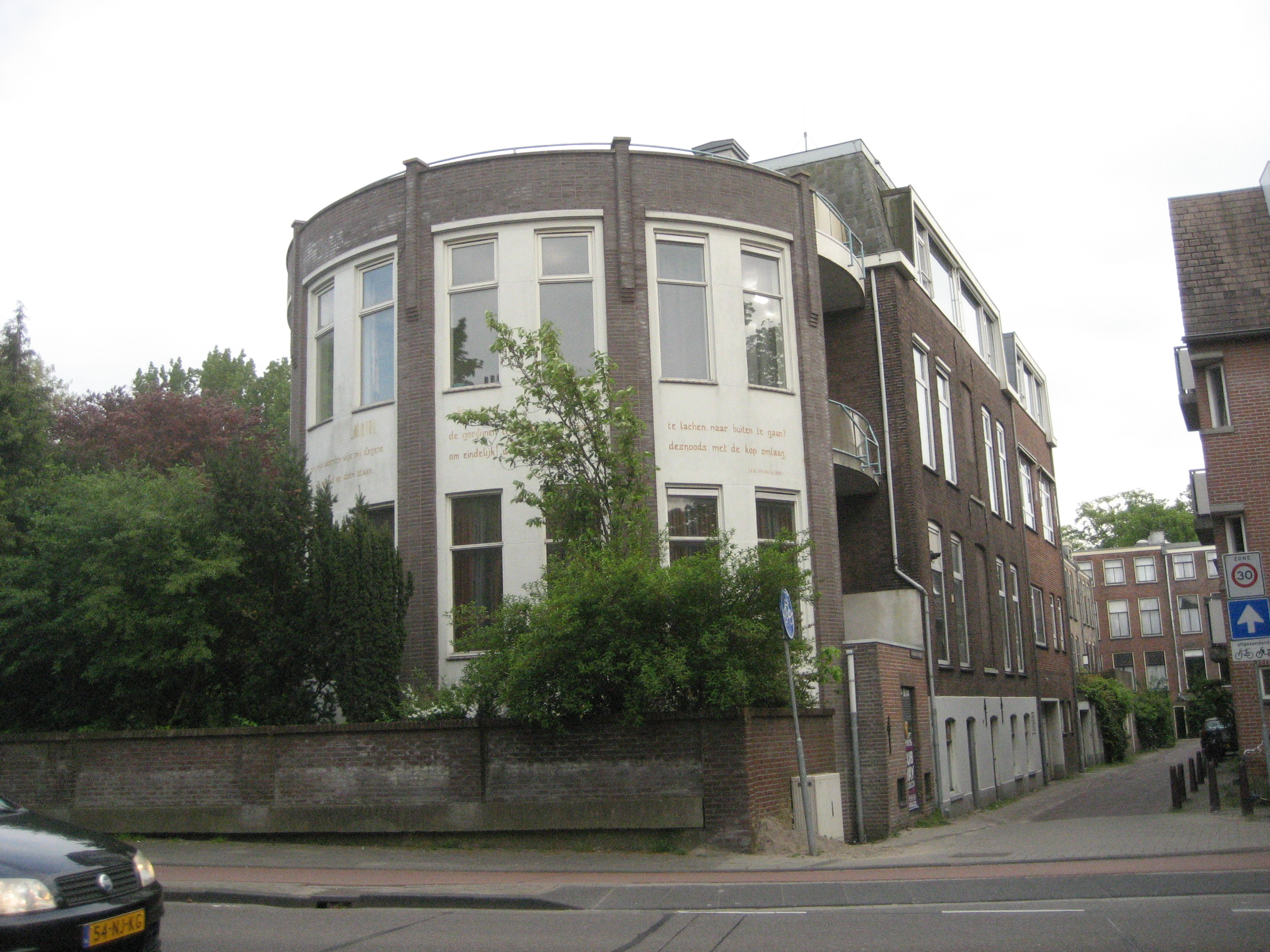
Poem In 14 boeken as a wall poem in Leiden

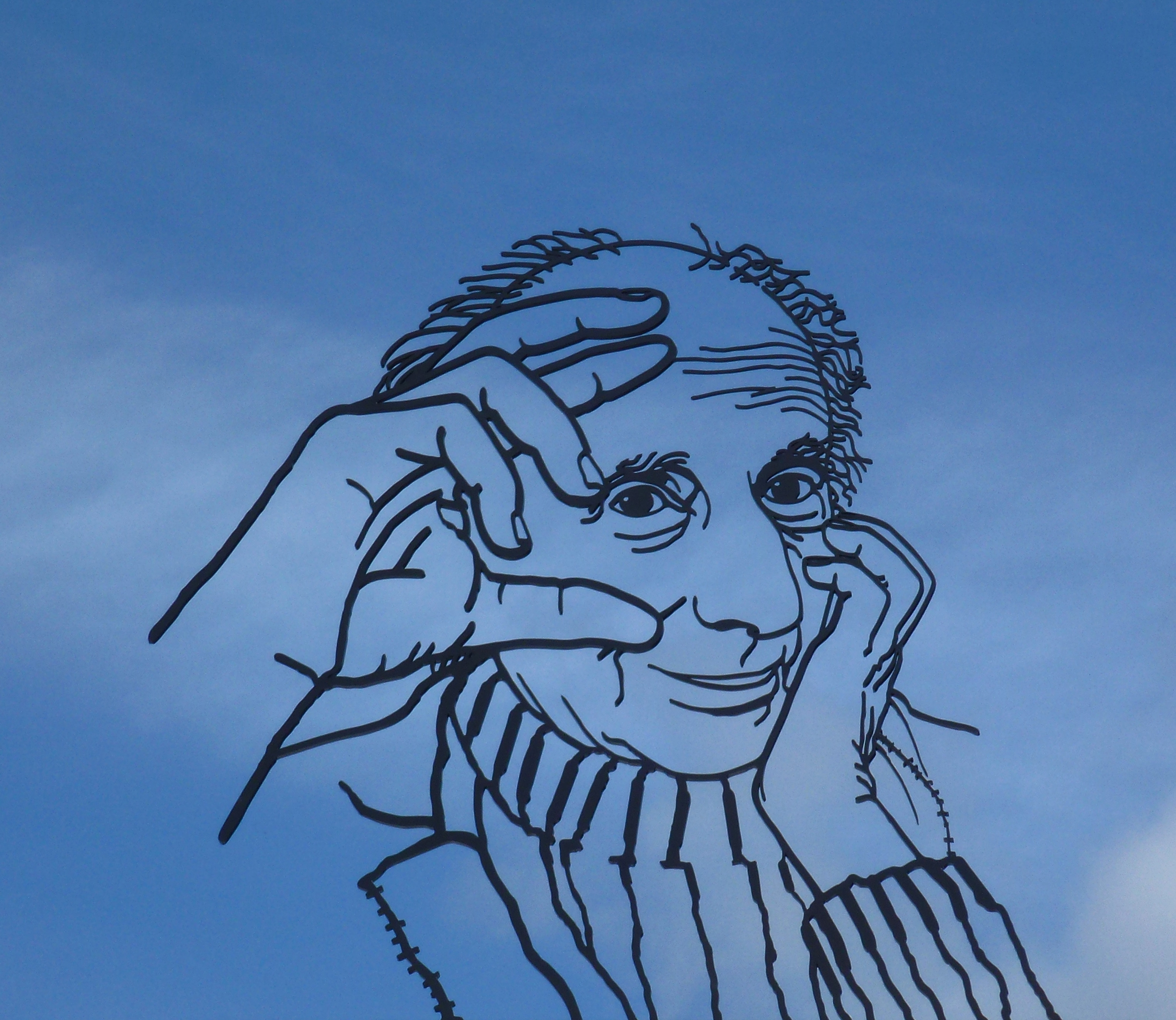
Portrait of Leo Vroman in Gouda (the Netherlands)

=== In English ===
- Poems in English (1953)
- Just one more world (poems and photographs) (1976)
- Love, greatly enlarged (1992)

== Scientific work ==
E.g.,

- Surface contact and thromboplastin formation (PhD Thesis, University of Utrecht) (1958).
- Blood, Garden City, N.Y. : Published for the American Museum of Natural History, Natural History Press, 1967.
- with Edward F Leonard: The Behavior of blood and its components at interfaces, Columbia University Seminar on Biomaterials, New York Academy of Sciences, New York, 1977. Vol. 283 in Annals of the New York Academy of Sciences
- with Edward F Leonard and Vincent T Turitto: Blood in contact with natural and artificial surfaces, New York Academy of Sciences, New York, N.Y., 1987. Vol. 516 in Annals of the New York Academy of Sciences

== See also ==
- Vroman effect
