= Biofunctionalisation =

In the field of bioengineering, biofunctionalisation (or biofunctionalization) is the modification of a material to have biological function and/or stimulus, whether permanent or temporary, while at the same time being biologically compatible.

Various types of medical implants are designed to biofunctionalize so that they are accepted by the host organism to replace or repair a defective biological function.
