= Biomedical tissue =

Tissue used for organ transplants

Biomedical tissue is biological tissue used for organ transplantation and medical research, particularly cancer research. When it is used for research it is a biological specimen.

Such tissues and organs may be referred to as implant tissue, allograft, xenograft, skin graft tissue, human transplant tissue, or implant bone. Tissue is stored in tissue establishments or tissue banks under cryogenic conditions. Fluids such as blood, blood products and urine are stored in fluid banks under similar conditions.

== Regulation ==
The collection, storage, analysis and transplantation of human tissue involves significant ethical and safety issues, and is heavily regulated. Each country sets its own framework for ensuring the safety of human tissue products.

The regulation of human transplantation in the United Kingdom is set out in the Human Tissue Act 2004 and managed by the Human Tissue Authority.

Tissue banks in the US are monitored by the Food and Drug Administration (FDA). The Code of Federal Regulations sets out the following topics:

- Donor Screening and Testing: the determination of donor suitability for human tissue intended for transplantation.
- Procedures and Records: the written procedures and records that must be kept
- Inspection of Tissue Establishments: the importation of tissues from abroad and the retention, recall, and destruction of human tissue.

== Notable regulation cases ==
- Biomedical Tissue Services, Inc. is at the heart of an investigation by the Food and Drug Administration. FDA Provides Information on Investigation into Human Tissue for Transplantation

== See also ==
- Biomaterial
- Implant (medicine)
- Biomesh
