= Joint replacement registry =

A joint replacement registry is a system of collecting information of arthroplasty outcomes at a population (often national) level, in order to provide an evidence-base for safe and effective treatment options.

== Background ==
The UK registry, the National Joint Registry ("NJR"), was set up as recommendation of a Royal College of Surgeons of England review into the high-profile failure of the 3M Capital Hip.

== Information collected ==
Registers collect information on a combination of hip replacements, knee replacements (both total and unicompartmental), shoulder replacements, ankle replacements and elbow replacements. Some countries exclude hemiarthroplasties done for traumatic hip fractures.

Initially designed only to record surgeon and implant performance, the main outcome collected was implant failure, however recently patient-reported outcome measures are being added.

== Research ==
Given the amount of information stored, the data from many of the registries is used as the basis of scientific papers, for example on the metal-on-metal hip controversy.

== Worldwide registries ==
There are currently 31 national members of the International Society of Arthroplasty Registers (ISAR). In addition, in the United States, there are 10 regional or private registries collecting data.

Country	Type	Year started	Name
UK	National	2003	NJR
Scotland	National		SAP
Ireland	National	2014	INOR
Italy	National		RIPO
Portugal	National	2009	RPA
Romania	National	2001	RNE
Germany	National	2012	EPRD
Egypt	National	2007	ECAR
Australia	National	1999	AOANJRR
Japan	National	2002	JAR
Sweden	National	1975	SKAR
Sweden	National	1979	SHAR
Canada	National	2003	CJRR
The Netherlands	National	2007	LROI
Slovakia	National	1926	SAR
New Zealand	National	1999	NZJR
Denmark	National	1997	DHR
Norway	National	1994	NAR
Finland	National	1980	
Iran	National	2016	IJR
United States	National	2012	AJRR
United States	Regional		CJRR
United States	Private	2001	KPTJRR
