= Urethanase =

Class of enzymes

Identifiers
- EC no.: 3.5.1.75
- CAS no.: 122007-70-9

Databases
- BRENDA: enzyme data
- ExPASy: NiceZyme view
- KEGG: enzyme entry
- MetaCyc: metabolic pathway
- Rhea: reactions
- PDB structures: RCSB PDB PDBe PDBsum
- Gene Ontology: AmiGO / QuickGO
Search
- PMC: articles
- PubMed: articles
- NCBI: proteins

Urethanase (EC 3.5.1.75) is an enzyme characterised from Citrobacter species that catalyzes the hydrolysis of ethyl carbamate (urethane) to give ethanol, ammonia, and carbon dioxide:

urethane
H_{2}O
NH_{3}
CH_{3}CH_{2}OH + CO_{2}

Ethyl carbamate is a known carcinogen and contaminant in food, so the enzyme is of interest as a means of removing it. Related enzymes have been sought which are capable of breaking down, and hence recycling, polyurethane-based plastics.

This enzyme is a hydrolase, one acting on carbon-nitrogen bonds other than peptide bonds, specifically in linear amides. The systematic name of this enzyme class is urethane amidohydrolase (decarboxylating). It is also called urethane hydrolase.
