= Protein adsorption =

Accumulation and adhesion of molecules to a surface without penetration

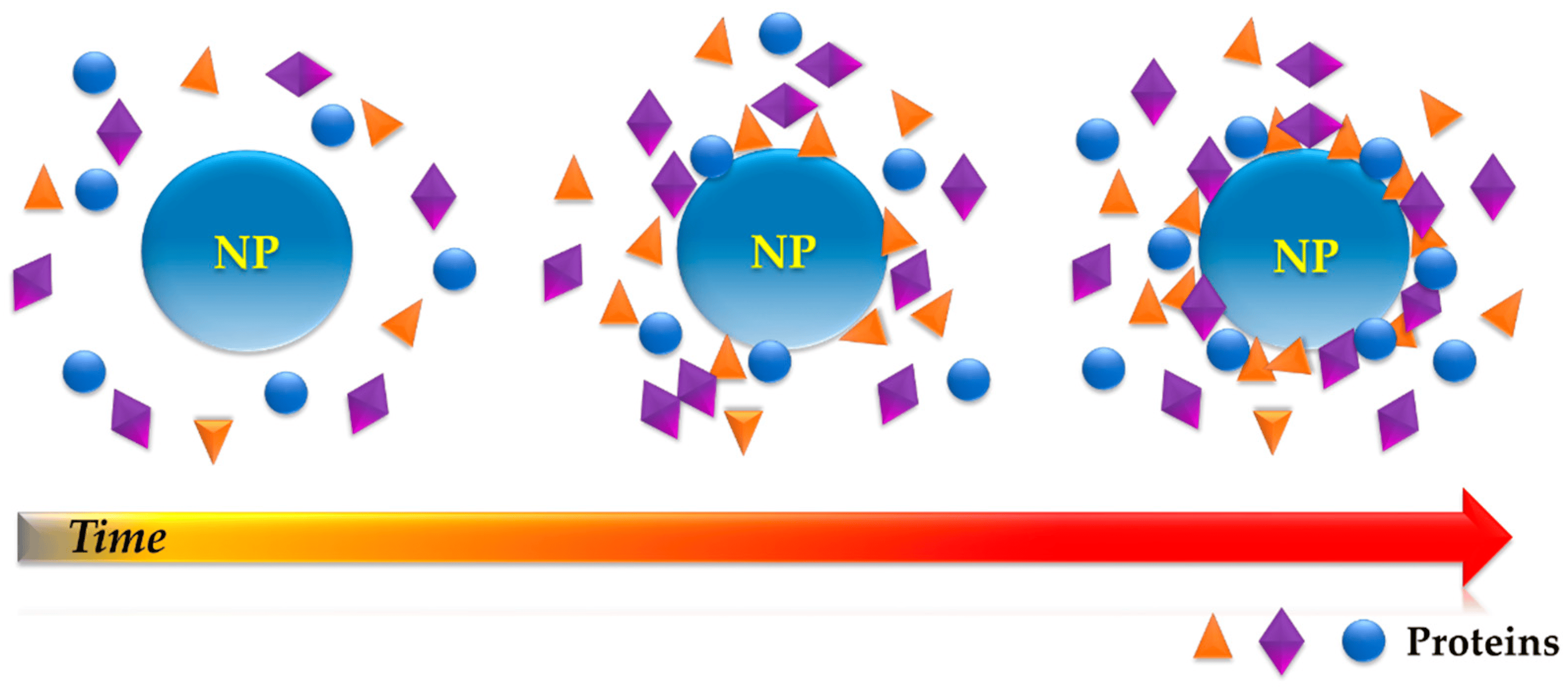
Protein adsorption onto a nanoparticle over time.

Adsorption (not to be mistaken for absorption) is the accumulation and adhesion of molecules, atoms, ions, or larger particles to a surface, but without surface penetration occurring. The adsorption of larger biomolecules such as proteins is of high physiological relevance, and as such they adsorb with different mechanisms than their molecular or atomic analogs. Some of the major driving forces behind protein adsorption include: surface energy, intermolecular forces, hydrophobicity, and ionic or electrostatic interaction. By knowing how these factors affect protein adsorption, they can then be manipulated by machining, alloying, and other engineering techniques to select for the most optimal performance in biomedical or physiological applications.

== Relevance ==
Many medical devices and products come into contact with the internal surfaces of the body, such as surgical tools and implants. When a non-native material enters the body, the first step of the immune response takes place and host extracellular matrix and plasma proteins aggregate to the material in attempts to contain, neutralize, or wall-off the injurious agent. These proteins can facilitate the attachment of various cell types such as osteoblasts and fibroblasts that can encourage tissue repair. Taking this a step further, implantable devices can be coated with a bioactive material to encourage adsorption of specific proteins, fibrous capsule formation, and wound healing. This would reduce the risk of implant rejection and accelerate recovery by selecting for the necessary proteins and cells necessary for endothelialization. After the formation of the endothelium, the body will no longer be exposed to the foreign material, and will stop the immune response.

Proteins such as collagen or fibrin often serve as scaffolds for cell adhesion and cell growth. This is an integral part to the structural integrity of cell sheets and their differentiation into more complex tissue and organ structures. The adhesion properties of proteins to non-biological surfaces greatly influences whether or not cells can indirectly attach to them via scaffolds. An implant like a hip-stem replacement necessitates integration with the host tissues, and protein adsorption facilitates this integration.

Surgical tools can be designed to be sterilized more easily so that proteins do not remain adsorbed to a surface, risking cross-contamination. Some diseases such as Creutzfeldt–Jakob disease and kuru (both related to mad cow disease) are caused by the transmission of prions, which are errant or improperly folded forms of a normally native protein. Surgical tools contaminated with prions require a special method of sterilization to completely eradicate all trace elements of the misfolded protein, as they are resistant to many of the normally used cleansing methods.

However, in some cases, protein adsorption to biomaterials can be an extremely unfavorable event. The adhesion of clotting factors may induce thrombosis, which may lead to stroke or other blockages. Some devices are intended to interact with the internal body environment such as sensors or drug-delivery vehicles, and protein adsorption would hinder their effectiveness.

== Fundamentals of protein adsorption ==
Proteins are biomolecules that are composed of amino acid subunits. Each amino acid has a side chain that gains or loses charge depending on the pH of the surrounding environment, as well as its own individual polar/nonpolar qualities.

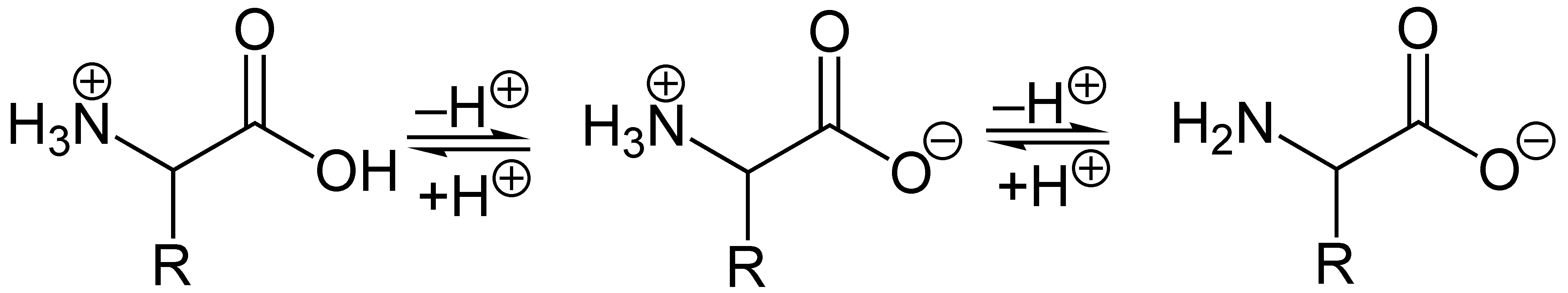
Amino acid titration

Charged regions can greatly contribute to how that protein interacts with other molecules and surfaces, as well as its own tertiary structure (protein folding). As a result of their hydrophilicity, charged amino acids tend to be located on the outside of proteins, where they are able to interact with surfaces. It is the unique combination of amino acids that gives a protein its properties. In terms of surface chemistry, protein adsorption is a critical phenomenon that describes the aggregation of these molecules on the exterior of a material. The tendency for proteins to remain attached to a surface depends largely on the material properties such as surface energy, texture, and relative charge distribution. Larger proteins are more likely to adsorb and remain attached to a surface due to the higher number of contact sites between amino acids and the surface (Figure 1).

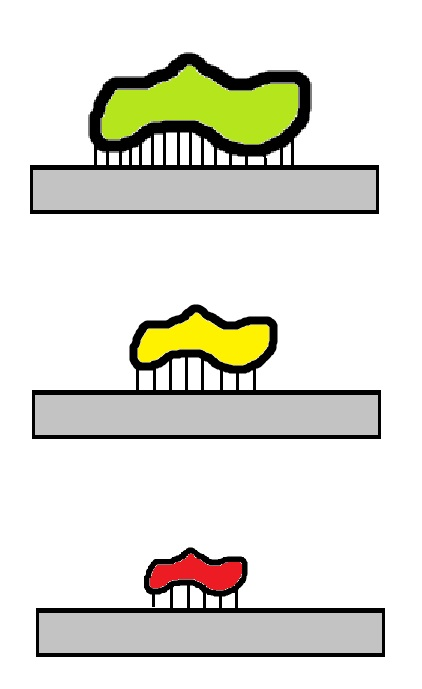
Figure 1. The effect of protein size on interaction with a surface. Notice that the larger protein composed of more amino acids is capable of making more interactions

=== Energy of protein adsorption ===
The fundamental idea behind spontaneous protein adsorption is that adsorption occurs when more energy is released than gained according to Gibbs law of free energy.

This is seen in the equation:

$\Delta_{ads} G = \Delta_{ads} H - {T} \Delta_{ads} S < 0$

where:

- ∆_{ads} is net change of the parameters
- G is Gibbs free energy
- T is the temperature (SI unit: kelvin)
- S is the entropy (SI unit: joule per kelvin)
- H is the enthalpy (SI unit: joule)

In order for the protein adsorption to occur spontaneously, ∆_{ads}G must be a negative number.

=== Vroman effect ===
Proteins and other molecules are constantly in competition with one another over binding sites on a surface. The Vroman effect, developed by Leo Vroman, postulates that small and abundant molecules will be the first to coat a surface. However, over time, molecules with higher affinity for that particular surface will replace them. This is often seen in materials that contact the blood where fibrinogen will bind to the surface first and over time will be replaced by kininogen.

=== Rate of adsorption ===
In order for proteins to adsorb, they must first come into contact with the surface through one or more of these major transport mechanisms: diffusion, thermal convection, bulk flow, or a combination thereof. When considering the transport of proteins, it is clear how concentration gradients, temperature, protein size and flow velocity will influence the arrival of proteins to a solid surface. Under conditions of low flow and minimal temperature gradients, the adsorption rate can be modeled after the diffusion rate equation.

==== Diffusion rate equation ====
${dn \over dt} = C_o({D \over \pi t})^{1/2}$

where:

- D is the diffusion coefficient
- n is the surface concentration of protein
- Co is the bulk concentration of proteins
- t is time

A higher bulk concentration and/or higher diffusion coefficient (inversely proportional to molecular size) results in a larger number of molecules arriving at the surface. The consequential protein surface interactions result in high local concentrations of adsorbed protein, reaching concentrations of up to 1000 times higher than in the bulk solution. However, the body is much more complex, containing flow and convective diffusion, and these must be considered in the rate of protein adsorption.

==== Flow in a thin channel ====
${\partial C \over \partial t} + V(y){\partial C \over \partial x} = D{\partial^2 C \over \partial y^2}$

and

${V(y) = \gamma y(1- {y \over b})}$

where:

- C is concentration
- D is the diffusion coefficient
- V is the velocity of flow
- x is the distance down the channel
- γ is the wall shear rate
- b is the height of the channel

This equation is especially applicable to analyzing protein adsorption to biomedical devices in arteries, e.g. stents.

== Forces and interactions influencing protein adsorption ==
The four fundamental classes of forces and interaction in protein adsorption are: 1) ionic or electrostatic interaction, 2) hydrogen bonding, 3) hydrophobic interaction (largely entropically driven), and 4) interactions of charge-transfer or particle electron donor/acceptor type.

=== Ionic or electrostatic interactions ===
The charge of proteins is determined by the pKa of its amino acid side chains, and the terminal amino acid and carboxylic acid. Proteins with isoelectric point (pI) above physiological conditions have a positive charge and proteins with pI below physiological conditions have a negative charge. The net charge of the protein, determined by the sum charge of its constituents, results in electrophoretic migration in a physiologic electric field. These effects are short-range because of the high di-electric constant of water, however, once the protein is close to a charged surface, electrostatic coupling becomes the dominant force.

=== Hydrogen bonding ===
Water has as much propensity to form hydrogen bonds as any group in a polypeptide. During a folding and association process, peptide and amino acid groups exchange hydrogen bonds with water. Thus, hydrogen bonding does not have a strong stabilizing effect on protein adsorption in an aqueous medium.

Illustration of two water molecules interacting to form a hydrogen bond

=== Hydrophobic interactions ===
Hydrophobic interactions are essentially entropic interactions basically due to order/disorder phenomena in an aqueous medium. The free energy associated with minimizing interfacial areas is responsible for minimizing the surface area of water droplets and air bubbles in water. This same principle is the reason that hydrophobic amino acid side chains are oriented away from water, minimizing their interaction with water. The hydrophilic groups on the outside of the molecule result in protein water solubility. Characterizing this phenomenon can be done by treating these hydrophobic relationships with interfacial free energy concepts. Accordingly, one can think of the driving force of these interactions as the minimization of total interfacial free energy, i.e. minimization of surface area.

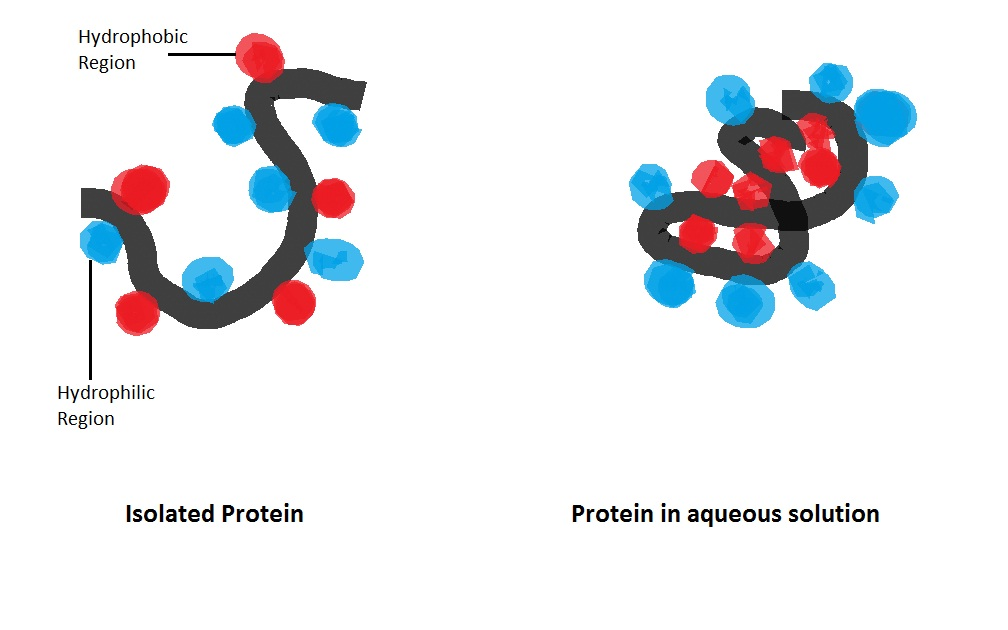
Illustration of how protein changes shape to allow polar regions (blue) to interact with water while non-polar hydrophobic regions (red) do not interact with the water.

=== Charge-transfer interactions ===
Charge-transfer interactions are also important in protein stabilization and surface interaction. In general donor-acceptor processes, one can think of excess electron density being present which can be donated to an electrophilic species. In aqueous media, these solute interactions are primarily due to pi orbital electron effects.

== Other factors influencing protein adsorption ==
=== Temperature ===
Temperature has an effect on both, the equilibrium state and kinetics of protein adsorption. The amount of protein adsorbed at high temperature is usually higher than that at room temperature. Temperature variation causes conformational changes in protein influencing adsorption. These conformational rearrangements in proteins results in an entropy gain which acts as a major driving force for protein adsorption. The temperature effect on protein adsorption can be seen in food manufacturing processes, especially liquid foods such as, milk which causes severe fouling on the wall surfaces of equipment where thermal treatment is carried out.

=== Ionic strength ===
Ionic strength determines the Debye length that correlates with the damping distance of the electric potential of a fixed charge in an electrolyte. So, higher the ionic strength the shorter are electrostatic interactions between charged entities. As a result, the adsorption of charged proteins to oppositely charged substrates is hindered whereas the adsorption to like charged substrates is enhanced, thereby influencing adsorption kinetics. Also, high ionic strength increases the tendency of proteins to aggregate.

=== Multi-protein system ===
When a surface is exposed to a multi-protein solution, adsorption of certain protein molecules are favored over the others. Protein molecules approaching the surface compete for binding sites. In multi-protein system attraction between molecules can occur, whereas in single-protein solutions intermolecular repulsive interactions dominate. In addition, there is a time-dependent protein spreading, where protein molecules initially make contact with minimal binding sites on the surface. With the increase in protein's residence time on the surface, the protein may unfold for interaction with additional binding sites. This results in a time-dependent increase in the contact points between protein and surface. This further makes desorption less likely.

== Experimental approaches for studying protein adsorption ==
=== Solution depletion technique ===
This technique measures a concentration change of proteins in bulk solution before and after adsorption, Δc_{p}. Any protein concentration change is attributed to the adsorbed layer, Γ_{p}.

Γ_{p} = Δc_{p} V/A_{tot}

where:

- V = total volume of protein solution
- A_{tot} = Total area available for adsorption

This method also requires a high surface area material such as particulate and beaded adsorbents.

=== Ellipsometry ===
Ellipsometry has been used widely for measuring protein adsorption kinetics as well as the structure of the adsorbed protein layer. It is an optical technique that measures the change of the polarization of light after reflection from a surface. This technique requires planar, reflecting surfaces, preferably quartz, silicon or silica, and a strong change in refractive index upon protein adsorption.

=== Atomic-force microscopy ===
Atomic-force microscopy (AFM) is a powerful microscopy technique used for studying samples at a nanoscale and is often used to image protein distribution on a surface. It consists of a cantilever with a tip to scan over the surface. It is a valuable tool for measuring protein-protein and protein-surface interaction. However, the limiting factor of many AFM studies is that imaging is often performed after drying the surface which might affect protein folding and the structure of the protein layer. Moreover, the cantilever tip can dislodge a protein or corrugate the protein layer.

=== Surface plasmon resonance ===
Surface plasmon resonance (SPR) has been widely used for measuring protein adsorption with high sensitivity. This technique is based on the excitation of surface plasmons, longitudinal electromagnetic waves originated at the interface between metals and dielectrics. The deposition on the conducting surface of molecules and thin layers within 200 nm modifies the dielectric properties of the system and thus the SPR response, signaling the presence of molecules on a metal surface.

=== Quartz crystal microbalance ===
Quartz crystal microbalance (QCM) is an acoustic sensor built around a disk shaped quartz crystal. It makes use of the converse piezoelectric effect. QCM, and extended versions such as QCM-D, has been widely used for protein adsorption studies, especially, real time monitoring of label-free protein adsorption. In addition to the adsorption studies, QCM-D also provides information regarding elastic moduli, viscosity, and conformational changes

=== Optical waveguide lightmode spectroscopy ===
Optical waveguide lightmode spectroscopy (OWLS) is a device that relies on a thin-film optical waveguide, enclosing a discrete number of guided electromagnetic waves. Guidance is achieved by means of a grating coupler. It is based on the measurements of effective refractive index of a thin-film layer above the waveguide. This technique works only on highly transparent surfaces.

Other methods widely used for measuring the amount of protein adsorbed on surfaces include radio-labelling, Lowry assay, scanning angle reflectometry, total internal reflection fluorescence, bicinchoninic acid assay etc.

== Protein adsorption to metals ==
=== Chemical composition ===
Metallic bonding refers to the specific bonding between positive metal ions and surrounding valence electron clouds. This intermolecular force is relatively strong, and gives rise to the repeated crystalline orientation of atoms, also referred to as its lattice system. There are several types of common lattice formations, and each has its own unique packing density and atomic closeness. The negatively charged electron clouds of the metal ions will sterically hinder the adhesion of negatively charged protein regions due to charge repulsion, thus limiting the available binding sites of a protein to a metal surface.

The lattice formation can lead to connection with exposed potential metal-ion-dependent adhesion sites (MIDAS) which are binding sites for collagen and other proteins. The surface of the metal has different properties than the bulk since the normal crystalline repeating subunits is terminated at the surface. This leaves the surface atoms without a neighboring atom on one side, which inherently alters the electron distribution. This phenomenon also explains why the surface atoms have a higher energy than the bulk, often simply referred to as surface energy. This state of higher energy is unfavorable, and the surface atoms will try to reduce it by binding to available reactive molecules.

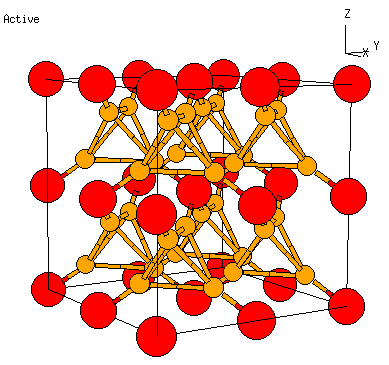
Notice in the diagram of Fe4C that the surface atoms are missing neighboring atoms.

This is often accomplished by protein adsorption, where the surface atoms are reduced to a more advantageous energy state.

The internal environment of the body is often modeled to be an aqueous environment at 37 °C at pH 7.3 with plenty of dissolved oxygen, electrolytes, proteins, and cells. When exposed to oxygen for an extended period of time, many metals may become oxidized and increase their surface oxidation state by losing electrons. This new cationic state leaves the surface with a net positive charge, and a higher affinity for negatively charged protein side groups. Within the vast diversity of metals and metal alloys, many are susceptible to corrosion when implanted in the body. Elements that are more electronegative are corroded faster when exposed to an electrolyte-rich aqueous environment such as the human body. Both oxidation and corrosion will lower the free energy, thus affecting protein adsorption as seen in Eq. 1.

=== Effects of topography ===
Surface roughness and texture has an undeniable influence on protein adsorption on all materials, but with the ubiquity of metal machining processes, it is useful to address how these impact protein behavior. The initial adsorption is important, as well as maintained adhesion and integrity. Research has shown that surface roughness can encourage the adhesion of scaffold proteins and osteoblasts, and results in an increase in surface mineralization. Surfaces with more topographical features and roughness will have more exposed surface area for proteins to interact with. In terms of biomedical engineering applications, micromachining techniques are often used to increase protein adhesion to implants in the hopes of shortening recovery time. The technique of laserpatterning introduces grooves and surface roughness that will influence adhesion, migration and alignment. Grit-blasting, a method analogous to sand blasting, and chemical etching have proven to be successful surface roughening techniques that promote the long-term stability of titanium implants. The increase in stability is a direct result of the observed increase in extracellular matrix and collagen attachment, which results in increased osteoblast attachment and mineralization when compared to non-roughened surfaces. Adsorption is not always desirable, however. Machinery can be negatively affected by adsorption, particularly with protein adsorption in the food industry.

== Protein adsorption to polymers ==
Polymers are of great importance when considering protein adsorption in the biomedical arena. Polymers are composed of one or more types of "mers" bound together repeatedly, typically by directional covalent bonds. As the chain grows by the addition of mers, the chemical and physical properties of the material are dictated by the molecular structure of the monomer. By carefully selecting the type or types of mers in a polymer and its manufacturing process, the chemical and physical properties of a polymer can be highly tailored to adsorb specific proteins and cells for a particular application.

=== Conformation effects ===
Protein adsorption often results in significant conformational changes, which refers to changes in the secondary, tertiary, and quartary structures of proteins. In addition to adsorption rates and amounts, orientation and conformation are of critical importance. These conformational changes can affect protein interaction with ligands, substrates, and antigens which are dependent on the orientation of the binding site of interest. These conformational changes, as a result of protein adsorption, can also denature the protein and change its native properties.

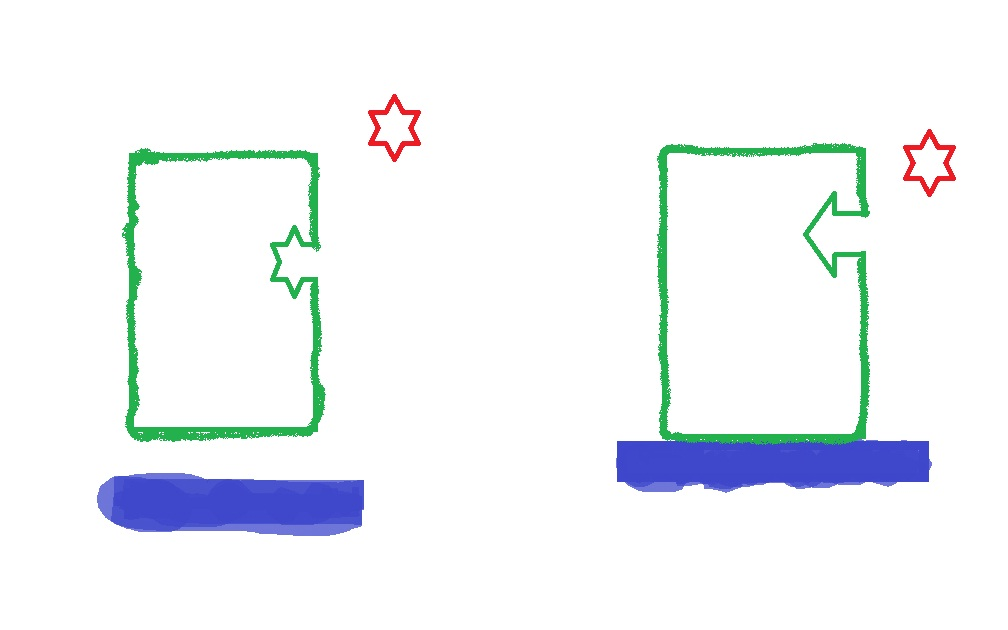
Illustration of protein (green) ligand (red star) binding site alteration by the conformational change of the protein as a result of surface (blue) adsorption. Note how the ligand no longer fits into the binding site.

=== Adsorption to polymer scaffolds ===
Tissue engineering is a relatively new field that utilizes a scaffolding as a platform upon which the desired cells proliferate. It is not clear what defines an ideal scaffold for a specific tissue type. The considerations are complex and protein adsorption only adds to the complexity. Although architecture, structural mechanics, and surface properties play a key role, understanding degradation and rate of protein adsorption are also key. In addition to the essentials of mechanics and geometry, a suitable scaffold construct will possess surface properties that are optimized for the attachment and migration of the cell types of particular interest.

Generally, scaffolds that closely resemble the natural environments of the tissue being engineered are the most successful. As a result, much research has gone into investigating natural polymers that can be tailored, through processing methodology, toward specific design criteria. Chitosan is currently one of the most widely used polymers as it is very similar to naturally occurring glycosaminoglycan (GAGs) and it is degradable by human enzymes.

==== Chitosan ====
Chitosan is a linear polysaccharide containing linked chitin-derived residues and is widely studied as a biomaterial due to its high compatibility with numerous proteins in the body. Chitosan is cationic and thus electrostatically reacts with numerous proteoglycans, anionic GAGs, and other molecules possessing a negative charge. Since many cytokines and growth factors are linked to GAG, scaffolds with the chitosan-GAG complexes are able to retain these proteins secreted by the adhered cells. Another quality of chitosan that gives it good biomaterial potential is its high charge density in solutions. This allows chitosan to form ionic complexes with many water-soluble anionic polymers, expanding the range of proteins that are able to bind to it and thus expanding its possible uses.

Table 1: Structures, target tissues, and application cell types of chitosan-based scaffolds
Polymer	Scaffold structure	Target tissue	Application cell type	Ref
Chitosan	3D porous blocks	Bone	Osteoblast-like ROS	
Chitosan-polyester	3D fiber meshes	Bone	Human MSC	
Chitosan-alginate	Injectable gel	Bone	Osteoblast-like MG63	
Chitosan-gelatin	3D porous cylinders	Cartilage	Chondrocytes	
Chitosan-GP	Injectable gel	Cartilage	Chondrocytes	
Chitosan-collagen	Porous membranes	Skin	Fibroblast and keratinocyte co-culture	

== Protein adsorption at fluid interfaces ==
Due to their amphiphilic chemistry proteins are surface active and adsorb at fluid interfaces. In multiphase systems like emulsions or foams proteins adsorb at the oil-water or air-water interface, respectively, and reduce the interface tension, thereby increasing their stability. Proteins are pH-dependent polyampholytes that undergo structural rearrangements upon adsorption, wherefore their adsorption depends on the protein thermodynamic stability, the pH and ionic strength of the aqueous phase, and the polarity of the respective phases. Protein adsorption at fluid interfaces plays a critical role in the production and stability of many food emulsions and foams like mayonnaise, whipped cream, or meringue and in physiological fluids like tear film, lipid droplets, or pulmonary surfactant. Certain enzymes like lipases involved in fat digestion act by adsorbing at the oil-water interface of ingested fat. Some animals exploit the foaming of secreted proteins, such as the sea snail Janthina janthina for passive flotation or certain species of spittlebug (Cercopidae) nymphs for protection from predators, moisture loss, and UV-radiation.

== Protein adsorption prediction ==
Protein adsorption on solid surfaces plays an important role in many applications, including medical and dental practice (e.g., implants and catheters), biomedical research (e.g., drug delivery and release), and devices for diagnostics and drug discovery (e.g., assays, microarrays, and lab-on-a-chip). Therefore, the accurate prediction of protein adsorption is critical in the progression of these sectors. Unfortunately, due to the inherent complexity of both the adsorption process and the protein molecular surface in general, protein adsorption prediction has continued to frustrate researchers.

=== Biomolecular Adsorption Database ===
In an effort to aid in the prediction of protein adsorption, researchers have created the Biomolecular Adsorption Database (BAD). BAD is a freely available online database with experimental protein adsorption data collected from the literature. The database can be used for the selection of materials for microfluidic device fabrication and for the selection of optimum operating conditions of lab-on-a-chip devices. The first version was published in 2009.

In 2024, an upgraded version, BAD2.0, was made publicly available. This database comprises 865 protein adsorption records (flat solid surfaces) from peer-reviewed literature. BAD 2.0 comprises only data that quantitatively report, completely, the descriptors of all three classes of descriptors relevant to protein adsorption: (i) the adsorbed protein, preferably identifiable in the Protein Data Bank (PDB); to allow further derivation of protein descriptors; (ii) the flat surface (type, water contact angle or surface tension); and (iii) fluid descriptors, i.e., protein concentration in solution, pH, ionic strength, and temperature. BAD2.0 also comprises auxiliary data, i.e., method of measurement, and the DOI of the relevant references for easy retrieval.
