= Vroman effect =

The Vroman effect, named after Leo Vroman, describes the process of competitive protein adsorption to a surface by blood serum proteins. The highest mobility proteins generally arrive first and are later replaced by less mobile proteins that have a higher affinity for the surface. The order of protein adsorption also depends on the molecular weight of the species adsorbing. Typically, low molecular weight proteins are displaced by high molecular weight protein while the opposite, high molecular weight being displaced by low molecular weight, does not occur. A typical example of this occurs when fibrinogen displaces earlier adsorbed proteins on a biopolymer surface and is later replaced by high molecular weight kininogen. The process is delayed in narrow spaces and on hydrophobic surfaces, fibrinogen is usually not displaced. Under stagnant conditions initial protein deposition takes place in the sequence: albumin; globulin; fibrinogen; fibronectin; factor XII, and HMWK.

== Molecular Mechanisms of Action ==
While the exact mechanism of action is still unknown many important protein physical properties play a part in the Vroman Effect. Proteins have many properties that are important to take into consideration when discussing protein adsorption. These properties include the protein size, charge, mobility, stability, and the structure and composition of the different protein domains that make up the protein's tertiary structure. Protein size determines the molecular weight. Protein charge determines whether preferentially or selective favorable interactions will exist between the protein and a biomaterial. Protein mobility plays a factor in adsorption kinetics.

=== Adsorption - Desorption Model ===
The simplest molecular explanation for the exchange of proteins on a surface is the adsorption/desorption model. Here, proteins interact with the surface of a biomaterial and "stick" on the material through interactions made with the protein and the biomaterial surface. Once a protein has adsorbed onto the surface of a biomaterial, the protein may change conformation (structure) and even become nonfunctional. The spaces between the proteins on the biomaterial then become available for new proteins to adsorb. Desorption occurs when the protein leaves the biomaterial surface. This simple model lacks in complexity, since Vroman-like behavior has been observed on hydrophobic surfaces as well as hydrophilic ones. Furthermore, adsorption and desorption doesn't completely explain competitive protein exchange on hydrophilic surfaces.

=== Transient Complex Model ===
A "transient complex" model was first proposed by Huetz et al. to explain this competitive exchange. This transient complex exchange occurs in three distinct steps. Initially a protein embeds itself into the monolayer of an already adsorbed homogenous protein monolayer. The aggregation of this new heterogenous protein mixture causes the "turning" of the double-protein complex which exposes the initially adsorbed protein to the solution. In the third step, the protein that was initially adsorbed can now diffuse out into the solution and the new protein takes over. This 3 part "transient complex mechanism" is further explained and verified through AFM imaging by Hirsh et al.

=== pH Cycling ===
Jung et al. also describe a molecular mechanism for fibrinogen displacement involving pH cycling. Here the αC domains of fibrinogen change charge after pH cycling which results in conformational changes to the protein that leads to stronger interactions with the protein and the biomaterial.

== Mathematical Models ==
The simplest mathematical model to explain the Vroman Effect is the Langmuir model using the Langmuir isotherm. More complex models include the Fruendlich isotherm and other modifications to the Langmuir model. This model explains the kinetics between reversible adsorption and desorption, assuming the adsorbate behaves as an ideal gas at isothermal conditions.

== See also ==
- Protein adsorption
- Langmuir adsorption model
