= Implant =

Device surgically placed within the body for medical purposes

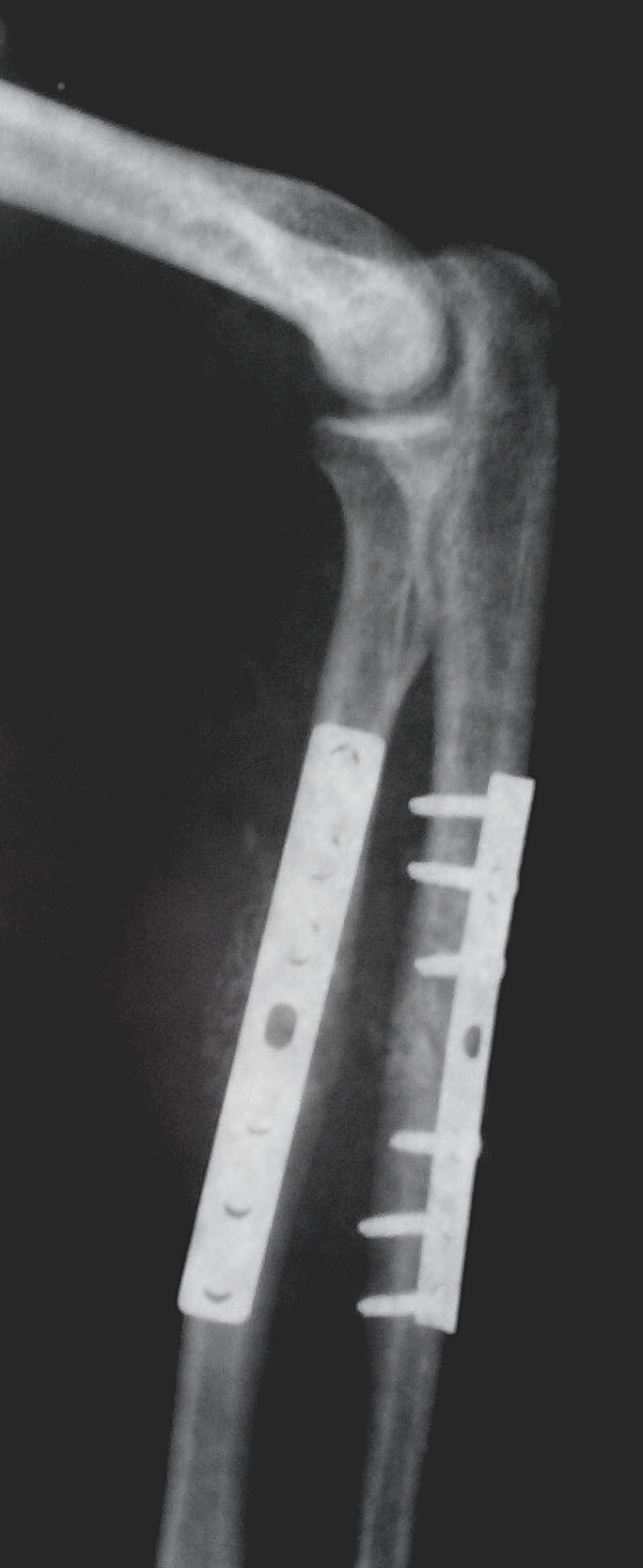
Orthopedic implants to repair fractures to the radius and ulna. Note the visible break in the ulna. (right forearm)

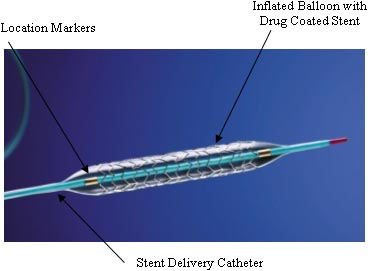
A coronary stent — in this case a drug-eluting stent — is another common item implanted in humans.

An implant is a medical device manufactured to replace a missing biological structure, support a damaged biological structure, or enhance an existing biological structure. For example, an implant may be a rod, used to strengthen weak bones. Medical implants are human-made devices, in contrast to a transplant, which is a transplanted biomedical tissue. The surface of implants that contact the body might be made of a biomedical material such as titanium, silicone, or apatite depending on what is the most functional. In 2018, for example, American Elements developed a nickel alloy powder for 3D printing robust, long-lasting, and biocompatible medical implants. In some cases implants contain electronics, e.g. artificial pacemaker and cochlear implants. Some implants are bioactive, such as subcutaneous drug delivery devices in the form of implantable pills or drug-eluting stents.

== Applications ==
Implants can roughly be categorized into groups by application:

=== Sensory and neurological ===
Sensory and neurological implants are used for disorders affecting the major senses and the brain, as well as other neurological disorders. They are predominately used in the treatment of conditions such as cataract, glaucoma, keratoconus, and other visual impairments; otosclerosis and other hearing loss issues, as well as middle ear diseases such as otitis media; and neurological diseases such as epilepsy, Parkinson's disease, and treatment-resistant depression. Examples include the intraocular lens, intrastromal corneal ring segment, cochlear implant, tympanostomy tube, and neurostimulator.

=== Cardiovascular ===
Cardiovascular medical devices are implanted in cases where the heart, its valves, and the rest of the circulatory system is in disorder. They are used to treat conditions such as heart failure, cardiac arrhythmia, ventricular tachycardia, valvular heart disease, angina pectoris, and atherosclerosis. Examples include the artificial heart, artificial heart valve, implantable cardioverter-defibrillator, artificial cardiac pacemaker, and coronary stent.

=== Orthopedic ===
Orthopaedic implants help alleviate issues with the bones and joints of the body. They are used to treat bone fractures, osteoarthritis, scoliosis, spinal stenosis, and chronic pain as well as in knee and hip replacements. Examples include a wide variety of pins, rods, screws, and plates used to anchor fractured bones while they heal.

Metallic glasses based on magnesium with zinc and calcium addition are tested as the potential metallic biomaterials for biodegradable medical implants.

Patients with orthopaedic implants sometimes need to be put under magnetic resonance imaging (MRI) machine for detailed musculoskeletal study. Therefore, concerns have been raised regarding the loosening and migration of implant, heating of the implant metal which could cause thermal damage to surrounding tissues, and distortion of the MRI scan that affects the imaging results. A study of orthopaedic implants in 2005 has shown that majority of the orthopaedic implants does not react with magnetic fields under the 1.0 Tesla MRI scanning machine with the exception of external fixator clamps. However, at 7.0 Tesla, several orthopaedic implants would show significant interaction with the MRI magnetic fields, such as heel and fibular implant.

=== Electric ===
Electrical implants are being used to relieve pain from rheumatoid arthritis. The electric implant is embedded in the neck of patients with rheumatoid arthritis, the implant sends electrical signals to electrodes in the vagus nerve. The application of this device is being tested an alternative to medicating people with rheumatoid arthritis for their lifetime.

=== Contraception ===
Contraceptive implants are primarily used to prevent unintended pregnancy and treat conditions such as non-pathological forms of menorrhagia. Examples include copper- and hormone-based intrauterine and subcutaneous devices .

=== Cosmetic ===
Cosmetic implants — often prosthetics — attempt to bring some portion of the body back to an acceptable aesthetic norm. They are used as a follow-up to mastectomy due to breast cancer, for correcting some forms of disfigurement, and modifying aspects of the body (as in buttock augmentation and chin augmentation). Examples include the breast implant, nose prosthesis, ocular prosthesis, and injectable filler.

=== Other organs and systems ===
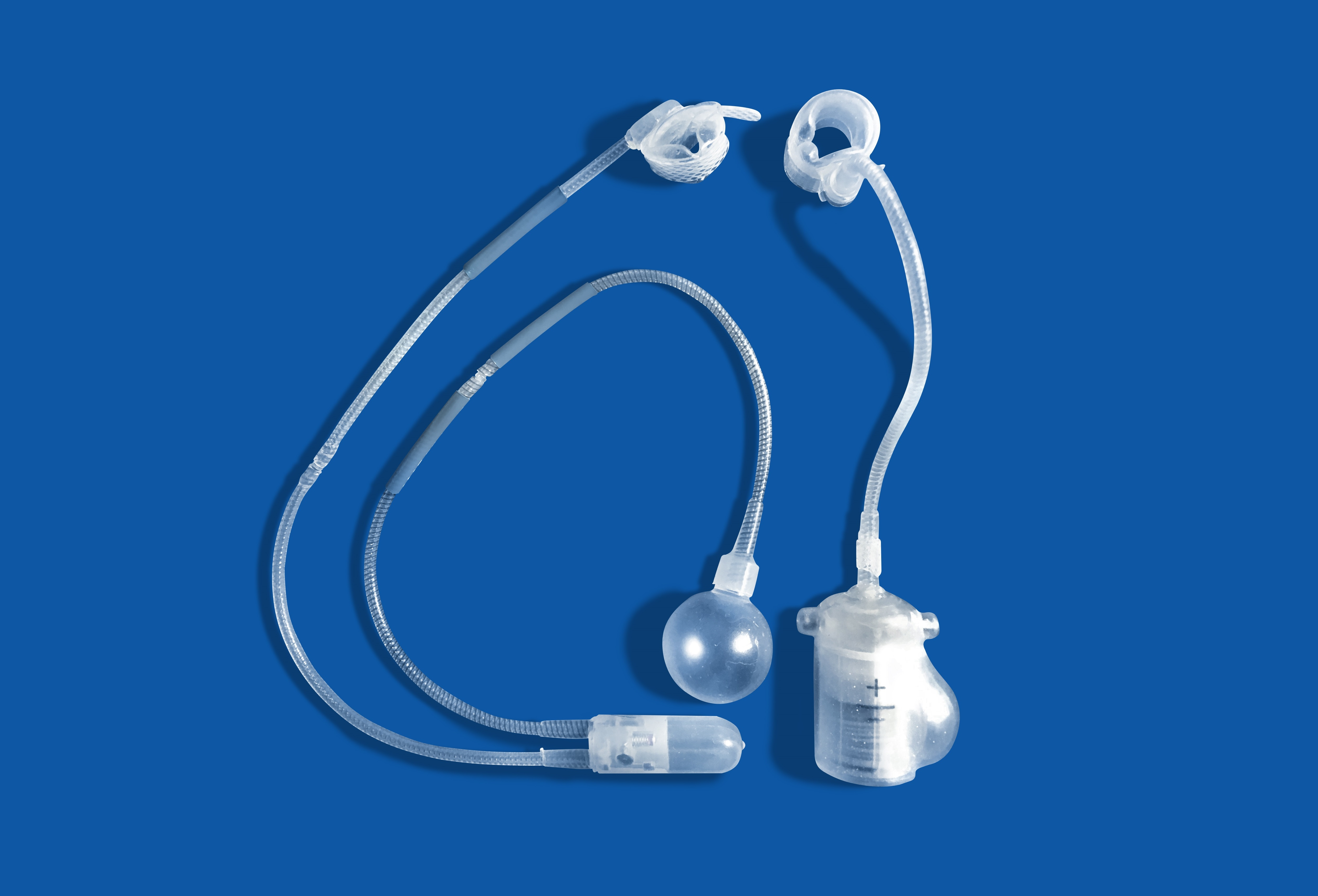
AMS 800 and ZSI 375 artificial urinary sphincters

Other types of organ dysfunction can occur in the systems of the body, including the gastrointestinal, respiratory, and urological systems. Implants are used in those and other locations to treat conditions such as gastroesophageal reflux disease, gastroparesis, respiratory failure, sleep apnea, urinary and fecal incontinence, and erectile dysfunction. Examples include the LINX, implantable gastric stimulator, diaphragmatic/phrenic nerve stimulator, neurostimulator, surgical mesh, artificial urinary sphincter and penile implant.

=== Drug-eluting implants ===
Drug‑eluting implants combine the structural benefits of traditional devices with advanced drug delivery systems, resulting in controlled release through the use of specialized materials. These implants often utilise biodegradable polymers—such as PLA, PGA, and PLGA for the controlled release of medications through the use of mechanisms like diffusion, polymer degradation, and osmotic pressure, ensuring high local concentrations while minimizing systemic side effects. This approach to controlled release tailors therapy to the specific needs of cardiovascular, ocular, and orthopaedic applications and leverages emerging technologies in materials science and nanotechnology to create advanced and personalized implantable systems

== Classification ==
=== United States classification ===
Medical devices are classified by the US Food and Drug Administration (FDA) under three different classes depending on the risks the medical device may impose on the user. According to 21CFR 860.3, Class I devices are considered to pose the least risk to the user and require the least control. Class I devices include simple devices such as arm slings and hand-held surgical instruments. Class II devices are considered to need more regulation than Class I devices and are required to undergo specific requirements before FDA approval. Class II devices include X-ray systems and physiological monitors. Class III devices require the most regulatory controls since the device supports or sustains human life or may not be well tested. Class III devices include replacement heart valves and implanted cerebellar stimulators. Many implants typically fall under Class II and Class III devices.

== Materials ==
=== Commonly implanted metals ===
A variety of minimally bioreactive metals are routinely implanted. The most commonly implanted form of stainless steel is 316L. Cobalt-chromium and titanium-based implant alloys are also permanently implanted. All of these are made passive by a thin layer of oxide on their surface. A consideration, however, is that metal ions diffuse outward through the oxide and end up in the surrounding tissue. Bioreaction to metal implants includes the formation of a small envelope of fibrous tissue. The thickness of this layer is determined by the products being dissolved, and the extent to which the implant moves around within the enclosing tissue. Pure titanium may have only a minimal fibrous encapsulation. Stainless steel, on the other hand, may elicit encapsulation of as much as 2 mm.

=== List of implantable metal alloys ===
==== Stainless Steel ====
- ASTM F138/F139 316L
- ASTM F1314 22Cr-13Ni–5Mn

==== Titanium Alloy ====
- ASTM F67 Unalloyed (Commercially Pure) Titanium
- ASTM F136 Ti-6Al-4V-ELI
- ASTM F1295 Ti-6Al-7Nb
- ASTM F1472 Ti-6Al-4V

==== Cobalt Chrome Alloy ====
- ASTM F90 Co-20Cr-15W-10Ni
- ASTM F562 Co-35Ni-20Cr-10Mo
- ASTM F1537 Co-28Cr-6Mo

==== Tantalum ====
- ASTM F560 Unalloyed Tantalum

=== Porosity in implants ===
Porous implants are characterized by the presence of voids in the metallic or ceramic matrix. Voids can be regular, such as in additively manufactured (AM) lattices, or stochastic, such as in gas-infiltrated production processes. The reduction in the modulus of the implant follows a complex nonlinear relationship dependent on the volume fraction of base material and morphology of the pores.

Experimental models exist to predict the range of modulus that stochastic porous material may take. Above 10% vol. fraction porosity, models begin to deviate significantly. Different models, such as the rule of mixtures for low porosity, two-material matrices have been developed to describe mechanical properties.

AM lattices have more predictable mechanical properties compared to stochastic porous materials and can be tuned such that they have favorable directional mechanical properties. Variables such as strut diameter, strut shape, and number of cross-beams can have a dramatic effect on loading characteristics of the lattice. AM has the ability to fine-tune the lattice spacing to within a much smaller range than stochastically porous structures, enabling the future cell-development of specific cultures in tissue engineering.

==== Porosity in implants serves two primary purposes ====
1) The elastic modulus of the implant is decreased, allowing the implant to better match the elastic modulus of the bone. The elastic modulus of cortical bone (~18 GPa) is significantly lower than typical solid titanium or steel implants (110 GPa and 210 GPa, respectively), causing the implant take up a disproportionate amount of the load applied to the appendage, leading to an effect called stress shielding.

2) Porosity enables osteoblastic cells to grow into the pores of implants. Cells can span gaps of smaller than 75 microns and grow into pores larger than 200 microns. Bone ingrowth is a favorable effect, as it anchors the cells into the implant, increasing the strength of the bone-implant interface. More load is transferred from the implant to the bone, reducing stress shielding effects. The density of the bone around the implant is likely to be higher due to the increased load applied to the bone. Bone ingrowth reduces the likelihood of the implant loosening over time because stress shielding and corresponding bone resorption over extended timescales is avoided. Porosity of greater than 40% is favourable to facilitate sufficient anchoring of the osteoblastic cells.

== Complications ==
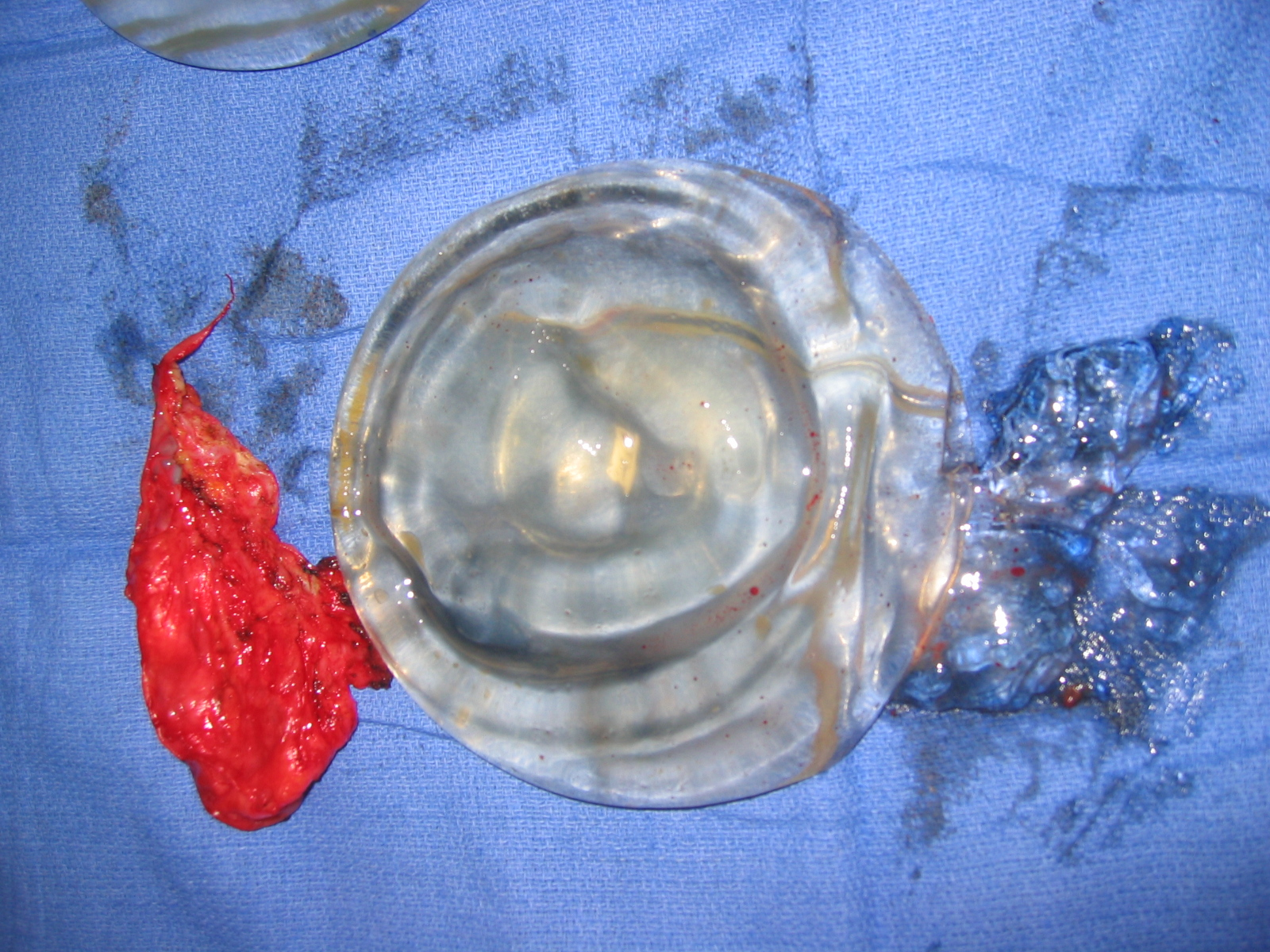
Complications can arise from implant failure. Internal rupturing of a breast implant can lead to bacterial infection, for example.

Under ideal conditions, implants should initiate the desired host response. Ideally, the implant should not cause any undesired reaction from neighbouring or distant tissues. However, the interaction between the implant and the tissue surrounding the implant can lead to complications. The process of implantation of medical devices is subjected to the same complications that other invasive medical procedures can have during or after surgery. Common complications include infection, inflammation, and pain. Other complications that can occur include risk of rejection from implant-induced coagulation and allergic foreign body response. Depending on the type of implant, the complications may vary.

When the site of an implant becomes infected during or after surgery, the surrounding tissue becomes infected by microorganisms. Three main categories of infection can occur after operation. Superficial immediate infections are caused by organisms that commonly grow near or on skin. The infection usually occurs at the surgical opening. Deep immediate infection, the second type, occurs immediately after surgery at the site of the implant. Skin-dwelling and airborne bacteria cause deep immediate infection. These bacteria enter the body by attaching to the implant's surface prior to implantation. Though not common, deep immediate infections can also occur from dormant bacteria from previous infections of the tissue at the implantation site that have been activated from being disturbed during the surgery. The last type, late infection, occurs months to years after the implantation of the implant. Late infections are caused by dormant blood-borne bacteria attached to the implant prior to implantation. The blood-borne bacteria colonize on the implant and eventually get released from it. Depending on the type of material used to make the implant, it may be infused with antibiotics to lower the risk of infections during surgery. However, only certain types of materials can be infused with antibiotics, the use of antibiotic-infused implants runs the risk of rejection by the patient since the patient may develop a sensitivity to the antibiotic, and the antibiotic may not work on the bacteria.

Inflammation, a common occurrence after any surgical procedure, is the body's response to tissue damage as a result of trauma, infection, intrusion of foreign materials, or local cell death, or as a part of an immune response. Inflammation starts with the rapid dilation of local capillaries to supply the local tissue with blood. The inflow of blood causes the tissue to become swollen and may cause cell death. The excess blood, or edema, can activate pain receptors at the tissue. The site of the inflammation becomes warm from local disturbances of fluid flow and the increased cellular activity to repair the tissue or remove debris from the site.

Implant-induced coagulation is similar to the coagulation process done within the body to prevent blood loss from damaged blood vessels. However, the coagulation process is triggered from proteins that become attached to the implant surface and lose their shapes. When this occurs, the protein changes conformation and different activation sites become exposed, which may trigger an immune system response where the body attempts to attack the implant to remove the foreign material. The trigger of the immune system response can be accompanied by inflammation. The immune system response may lead to chronic inflammation where the implant is rejected and has to be removed from the body. The immune system may encapsulate the implant as an attempt to remove the foreign material from the site of the tissue by encapsulating the implant in fibrinogen and platelets. The encapsulation of the implant can lead to further complications, since the thick layers of fibrous encapsulation may prevent the implant from performing the desired functions. Bacteria may attack the fibrous encapsulation and become embedded into the fibers. Since the layers of fibres are thick, antibiotics may not be able to reach the bacteria and the bacteria may grow and infect the surrounding tissue. In order to remove the bacteria, the implant would have to be removed. Lastly, the immune system may accept the presence of the implant and repair and remodel the surrounding tissue. Similar responses occur when the body initiates an allergic foreign body response. In the case of an allergic foreign body response, the implant would have to be removed.

== Failures ==
The many examples of implant failure include rupture of silicone breast implants, hip replacement joints, and artificial heart valves, such as the Bjork–Shiley valve, all of which have caused FDA intervention. The consequences of implant failure depend on the nature of the implant and its position in the body. Thus, heart valve failure is likely to threaten the life of the individual, while breast implant or hip joint failure is less likely to be life-threatening.

Devices implanted directly in the grey matter of the brain produce the highest quality signals, but are prone to scar-tissue build-up, causing the signal to become weaker, or even non-existent, as the body reacts to a foreign object in the brain.

In 2018, Implant files, an investigation made by ICIJ revealed that medical devices that are unsafe and have not been adequately tested were implanted in patients' bodies. In United Kingdom, Prof Derek Alderson, president of the Royal College of Surgeons, concludes: "All implantable devices should be registered and tracked to monitor efficacy and patient safety in the long-term."

== See also ==
- Drug-eluting implant
- Biofunctionalisation
- Implantable devices
- List of orthopedic implants
- Medical device
- Prosthesis
- Microchip implant
- Implant Files scandal
