= Bulwer =

Bulwer may refer to:

== People ==
- Henry Bulwer, 1st Baron Dalling and Bulwer (1801–1872), British politician, diplomat and writer
- Henry Ernest Gascoyne Bulwer (1836–1914), British colonial administrator and diplomat, nephew of Henry Bulwer
- James Bulwer (1794–1879), English collector, naturalist and conchologist
- James Redfoord Bulwer (1820–1899), British politician
- John Bulwer (1606–1656), English physician and writer
- Lorina Bulwer (1838-1912) Workhouse inmate and textile artist

== Other ==
- Bulwer, Queensland, Australia
- Bulwer Island, Queensland, Australia
- Bulwer, New Zealand (in Pelorus Sound)
- Bulwer, KwaZulu-Natal, South Africa
- Bulwer's petrel (Bulweria bulwerii), named after James Bulwer
- Bulwer's pheasant (Lophura bulweri), named after Henry Ernest Gascoyne Bulwer
- Clayton–Bulwer Treaty, 1850 treaty between the United States and Great Britain

== See also ==
- Bulwer-Lytton, a surname
- Bulweria
