= John Frederick Wilkinson =

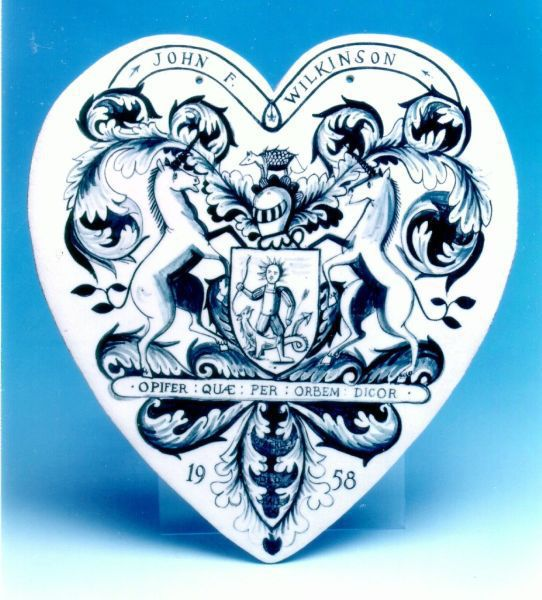
Reproduction pill tile produced for Wilkinson with the Society of Apothecaries arms.

John Frederick "Wilkie" Wilkinson FRCP FRIC (10 June 1897, Oldham, Lancashire — 13 August 1998, Knutsford, Cheshire) was a chemist, physician, and pioneering haematologist. He was among the first physicians to experiment with chemotherapy for leukaemia.

After secondary education at Arnold School, Wilkinson began in 1913 his study of chemistry at the University of Manchester. In 1916, during World War I, he joined the Royal Naval Air Service.

He saw action at the Battle of Zeebrugge in 1918 while serving on HMS Vindictive. His name was put forward for the ballot for the award of the Victoria Cross for his conduct on the Mole, part of the sea defence wall of Zeebrugge harbour. According to official accounts, Vindictive came alongside the Mole and Wilkinson ran along it, throwing bombs into the U-boats. However, only one VC could be awarded per action and he was not chosen.

His work with the Navy to train sea-lions in the defusing of bombs was not an entire success. The sea-lions were carefully trained in their task, and then released into the sea from their specially designed harnesses. However, instead of following their training, they would swim away and never be seen again.

When the war ended, Wilkinson resumed his study of chemistry at the Victoria University of Manchester, graduating in 1920 BSc with first class honours, in 1921 MSc, and in 1923 PhD. At the same university he became a demonstrator in crystallography, but then studied medicine, qualifying MB ChB Manch in 1928. Experience of the effects of mustard gas in World War I suggested to him that nitrogen mustards might be effective against bone marrow cancers. With Martin C. G. Israëls, Wilkinson experimented with these agents as therapy for patients with leukaemia.

The official history of Christie Cancer Hospital in Manchester, where he was honorary consulting haematologist, records his use of war gases (including nitrogen and mustard gas) on cancer patients, with encouraging results.

He was a keen motorcyclist, and would travel long distances by bike. During the Twenties he found buttons inconvenient on his motorcycling gear and had a zip incorporated into the design of his moleskin trousers, long before commercial manufacturers took up the idea.

In his youth he was extremely active in The Boy Scouts Association. As a scout he was presented with a badge by Baden-Powell in 1919. In 1924 the increasing demands of his medical career caused him to resign from most of his Scouting commitments, but he continued his involvement with Scouting until his death. He had a large and successful private practice mainly at his rooms at Lorne Street, Chorlton-on-Medlock, Manchester, but he sometimes made domiciliary visits in the counties near Manchester.

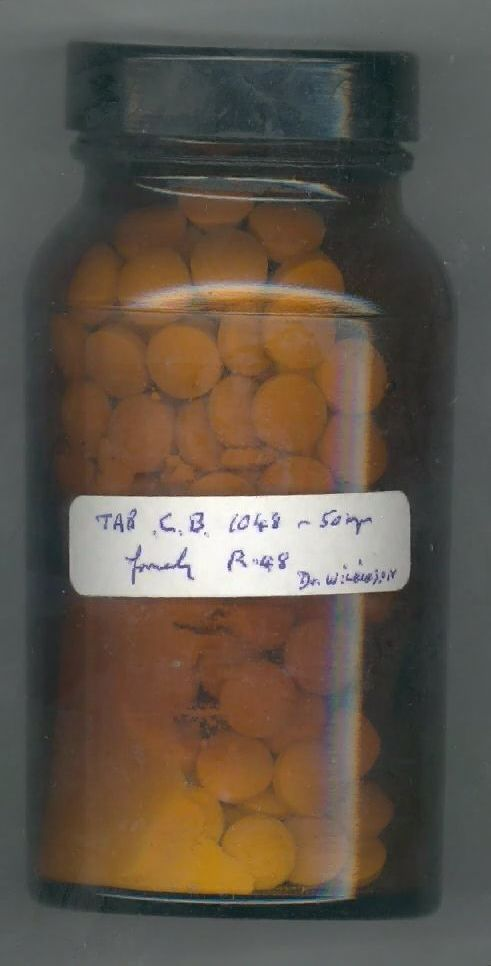
Chlornaphazine used in Wilkinson's chemotherapy trials.

In 1926 George R. Minot and William P. Murphy published their famous paper on feeding raw liver to patients with pernicious anaemia. Wilkinson demonstrated a relation between diet and haematinic activity in tissue by studying stomachs and livers from many species of animals at Manchester's Belle Vue Zoological Gardens and later at Chester Zoo. From 1928 to 1947 at the Manchester Royal Infirmary he was director of the department of clinical investigations and research.

In 1931 he graduated with medical research MD from the medical school of the University of Manchester. During the 1930s he once was called upon to delouse the entire ballet company of the Sadler Wells Ballet. From 1934 to 1948 he was a lecturer in systematic medicine at the Victoria University of Manchester. Wilkinson was from 1938 to 1946 the director of the Manchester and Salford Blood Transfusion Service and from 1939 to 1946 a regional officer for the North West Blood Transfusion Service. During the 1940s he, with Frank Fletcher, did pioneering research on chemotherapy for leukæmia, Hodgkin's disease, and polycythæmia vera. From 1947 to 1962 Wilkinson was at the University of Manchester a reader in medicine and haematology and at the Manchester Royal Infirmary head of the department of haematology. He was a co-founder, with Leslie John Witts, of the British Society for Haematology. In 1962 Wilkinson retired from the National Health Service, but he continued to treat patients when he was in his nineties.

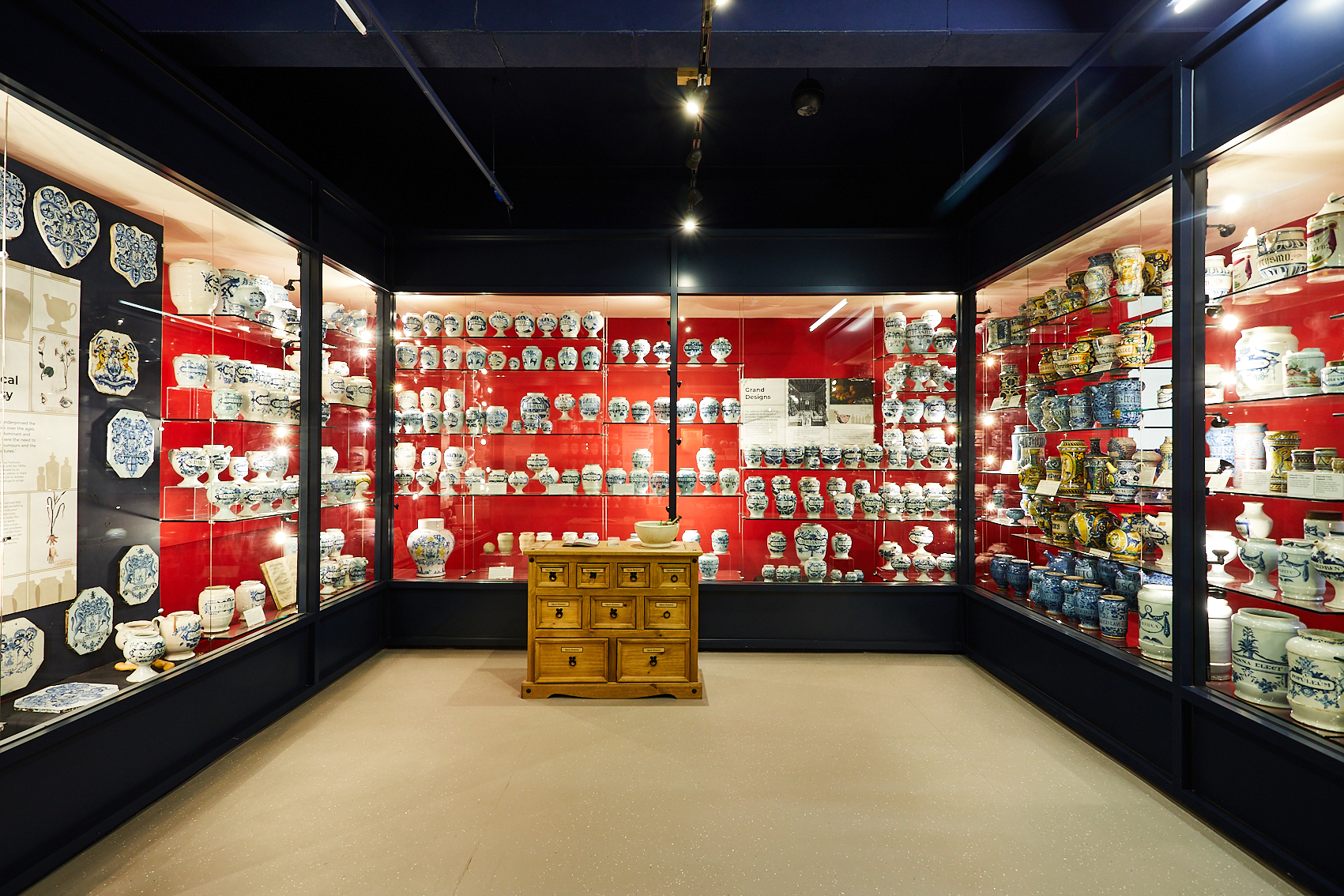
Wilkinson's apothecary jar collection, Thackray Museum of Medicine

In 1977 in his Samuel Gee lecture, Wilkinson described his extensive collection of antique medicine jars. The collection is now displayed at the Thackray Museum of Medicine in Leeds. He was a motorist on both roads and race-courses, a keeper of tropical fish, and a collector of antique porcelain (as well as antique medical jars).

In 1964 in Bucklow, Cheshire, he married Marion Crossfield (1920–2003), a Major in the Women's Royal Army Corps, but they separated in the 1990s.

== Awards and honours ==
- 1937 — FRCP
- 1948 — Oliver Sharpey Lecturer of the Royal College of Physicians (RCP)
- 1976 – Honorary DSc Bradford
- 1977 – Samuel Gee Lecturer of the RCP
- 1981 – Osler Lecturer of the Worshipful Society of Apothecaries
- 1992 — Silver Wolf Award from The Scout Association
