= John Charnley =

British surgeon

- Born: 29 August 1911; Bury, Lancashire, England
- Died: 5 August 1982 (aged 70); Manchester, England
- Education: Victoria University of Manchester
- Known for: Hip replacement
- Awards: Gairdner Foundation International Award (1973); Lasker-DeBakey Clinical Medical Research Award (1974); Cameron Prize for Therapeutics of the University of Edinburgh (1974); Lister Medal (1975); Albert Medal (1978); Fellow of the Royal Society
- Scientific career
- Fields: Orthopaedic surgeon

Sir John Charnley, CBE, FRS (29 August 1911 – 5 August 1982) was an English orthopaedic surgeon. He pioneered the hip replacement operation, which is now one of the most common operations both in the UK and elsewhere in the world, and created the "Wrightington centre for hip surgery". He also demonstrated the fundamental importance of bony compression in operations to arthrodese (fuse) joints, in particular the knee, ankle and shoulder.

Charnley also influenced generations of orthopaedic surgeons through his textbook on conservative fracture treatment which was first published in 1950.

== Early life ==
John Charnley was born in Bury, in Lancashire, on 29 August 1911.

His father, Arthur Walker Charnley, was a chemist and had a chemist's shop at 25 Princess Street; his mother, Lily, had trained as a nurse at Crumpsall Hospital. He also had a younger sister, Mary Clare.

John went to the Bury Grammar Junior School in 1919, moving on to the Senior school in 1922. He had a scientific aptitude and was encouraged to study chemistry and physics.

In the autumn of 1929 he gained admission to the Medical School of the Victoria University of Manchester, from where he graduated with a Bachelor of Medicine, Bachelor of Surgery and Bachelor of Science (Anatomy and Physiology) in 1935.

== First surgery and war service ==
From 15 August 1935, Charnley was appointed a House Surgeon at the Central Branch of Manchester Royal Infirmary in Roby Street, and after three months he went to the main Infirmary where he completed his year as House Surgeon.

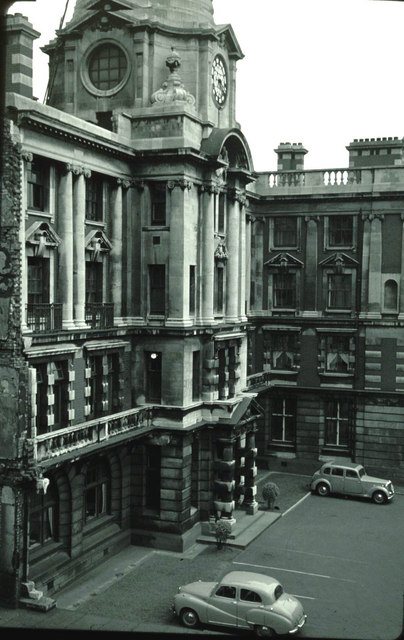
Manchester Royal Infirmary, 1957

As his friend David Lloyd Griffiths remembers, Charnley considered the possibility of becoming involved with cancer research, but most of his professors thought it was a waste of time and dissuaded him. He planned to achieve the status of Fellow of the Royal College of Surgeons as soon as possible and, after having attended the fellowship course at Guy's Hospital in London, he passed the final examination on 10 December 1936.

He obtained the post of Resident Surgical Officer at Salford Royal Hospital on 1 January 1937, and after 21 months he unsuccessfully applied for the similar post at Manchester Royal Infirmary. He then realised the career opportunities presented by research work and was appointed as a demonstrator in physiology at King's College London in October 1938.

The opportunity to return to Manchester came when he was appointed a Resident Casualty Officer (RCO) in April 1939. This work put him in contact with many orthopaedic specialists, since he was responsible for cases presenting at the daily morning fracture clinics. During the afternoons and nights, he acted as the Resident Surgical Officer, operating on general emergencies.

By the end of 1939, Charnley's projects had been stymied by the outbreak of World War II. He joined the troops as a volunteer in the Royal Army Medical Corps on 1 May 1940 and, after a training period, he was posted to Dover as a Regimental Medical Officer. He participated in the British evacuation of Dunkirk and, subsequently, he was sent to 31st General Hospital at Hellingly, East Sussex. He then moved to Davyhulme Park Hospital and later to the General Hospital at Garrioch.

Finally, he was sent to Cairo; there he spent most of his military service under the supervision of orthopaedic surgeon Dudley Buxton. Buxton had a high opinion of Charnley and gave him more responsibilities by sending him to the 2nd Orthopaedic Centre and putting him in charge of the new orthopaedic workshop. That experience probably encouraged him to apply for the orthopaedic school in 1942, with the support of his senior colleagues. He was promoted to the rank of Acting Major on 2 December 1942.

He ended his military service in May 1944, when he joined the orthopaedics staff at Shaftesbury Hospital.

== Back to Manchester ==
The end of the war was also the beginning of a national scheme for the cure of crippled children, which involved the use of open-air rural orthopaedic hospitals. One of these was the Robert Jones and Agnes Hunt Orthopaedic Hospital at Gobowen, near Oswestry in Shropshire, and Harry Platt recommended that Charnley went there in order to improve his skills as an orthopaedic surgeon. He was resident in the hospital for six months in 1946, during which he developed his interest in bone grafting. In order to satisfy his curiosity about bony union, he persuaded a junior colleague to test a surgical procedure on his leg, which resulted in a wound infection that forced the colleague to bed for some weeks. Thereafter, Charnley returned to Manchester, again with the support of Platt, who had brought to the Royal Infirmary a group of young and brilliant orthopaedic specialists, which included Lloyd Griffiths. Charnley and Griffiths became joint honorary assistant orthopaedic surgeons in 1947. They both needed more clinical independence, and Platt arranged that Charnley saw some more clinical patients in other hospitals.

In May 1948, he participated in a work trip to the United States, visiting hospitals there, together with other young orthopaedic surgeons. The experience caused him to consider the possibility of basing himself in the USA, but that country's restrictions on experimental surgeries were unacceptable to him.

He was interested in two basic orthopaedic problems: the effect of compression on the healing of cancellous bone, and the lubrication of joints. He was convinced that collaborations with mechanical engineers, with whom he developed strong relationships, were fundamental to expanding his knowledge and improving his work.

Charnley's research was based on two different aspects: clinical, for the treatment of patients with osteoarthritis, and biomechanical, with experiments to determine the fundamentals of bony union and the conditions governing the spontaneous regeneration of articular cartilage.

When he returned to Manchester after the war, the facilities available did not live up to his expectations. From then on, he began to think of reducing the number of clinical sessions he was undertaking, in order to carry out his research elsewhere. He finally opted for this path in 1958, informing the Manchester Royal Infirmary surgeons' committee that he wished to hand over three of his four clinical sessions in order to set up a hip surgery centre at Wrightington Hospital, Lancashire. The committee agreed to his request for a period of three years, after taking into account his skills and reputation. The decision was to be reviewed at the end of that period.

== Wrightington and hip implant ==
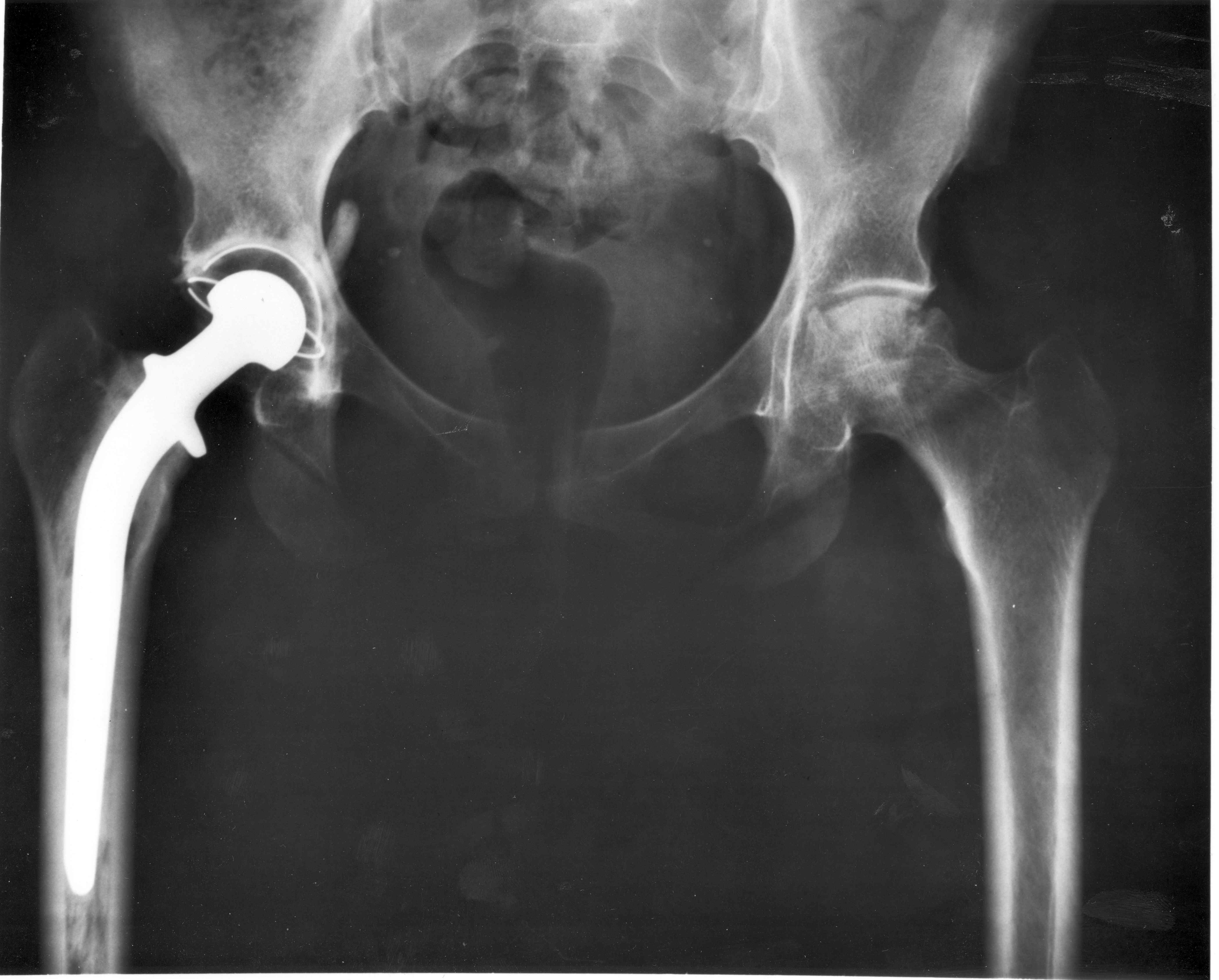
Hip replacement Image 3684-PH

Wrightington had formerly been a centre for the treatment of tuberculosis. Improved living conditions and pasteurisation of milk had caused a decline in the incidence of that illness and many hospitals were seeking new medical endeavors upon which to focus. In the case of Wrightington, it was Charnley's hip surgery centre that came to the fore.

Charnley's first aim at Wrightington was to build a biomechanical laboratory that could be used to test his instruments and inventions. He organised a fund raising campaign for this purpose and the laboratory opened on 23 June 1961. His first studies concerned lubrication of joints. At that time, some surgeons were supporting the hydrodynamic theory, which assumed that the two faces of a joint are not perfectly congruous, and that a film of synovial fluid is responsible for the low friction of the surfaces. Charnley disagreed with that theory; through his experiments, he was able to demonstrate that the low friction does not depend on the fluid presence. The studies led to the development of the Low Friction Arthroplasty concept, which assumed that the low friction depended mostly on the friction coefficient of the facing materials, and only marginally on the fluid presence.

This discovery caused him to begin looking for a slippery substance that could be used for the socket of a total hip replacement operation. Polytetrafluorethylene (PTFE, also known as Teflon) seemed to meet this requirement. After some apparently successful experiments with the material, he adopted it for his hip replacement surgeries. They were carried out as follows: discarding the head of the femur; replacing it with a metallic implant that was fixed with acrylic cement; and, using a PTFE acetabular socket, insertion of the implant into the acetabulum.

At first, the result seemed to be satisfactory, however, approximately one year after the first operations (about 1960), it became clear that PTFE was not a suitable material. It showed signs of wear and, most importantly, its reaction with soft tissues caused the formation of granulomatous masses that in almost all cases required a further operation to enable their removal. This setback in Charnley's research affected him for some time.

His determination pushed him to seek an alternate material. He continued to test various materials, until a salesman approached him offering Ultra-high-molecular-weight polyethylene (UHMWPE), which he rejected because of his lack of understanding of the problem; his assistant told him privately that he would endeavor to test it. It was serendipity, and he immediately grasped the potential of the HMWP; after some tests, Charnley implanted it for the first time in November 1962. Mindful of his previous failure with the PTFE socket, he waited for a year, during which time he carefully observed the status of his patients. Five years later, when he was convinced that HMWP was a safe material, he announced his discovery, making it possible for other surgeons to use it. As time went by, the number of operations increased, and Charnley designed a machine which mechanically built prostheses and sockets, as well as an apparatus for evaluating patients for their hip disorders before and after the operation.

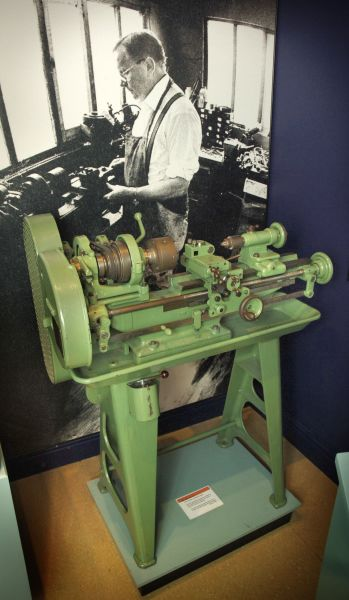
Lathe used by Charnley to make acetabular cups for hip replacements, on display at Thackray Museum of Medicine.

He collaborated very closely with the firm of Chas. F. Thackray Ltd in Leeds, whom he had first asked to make instruments for him in 1947. Charnley refined his hip replacement operation throughout his long association with Thackray's and was still working on improvements when he died. At first Thackray's made the stainless steel stems, while Charnley made the sockets himself, turning them on a lathe in his workshop at home. Later his technicians made instruments under close supervision and then Thackray's manufactured them. As time went on, Thackray's contributed their own design suggestions; this continual exchange of ideas was a significant factor in the advance of the hip operation.

Charnley was convinced that the best way to fix the prosthesis into the femur was to use bone cement that acted as a grout rather than as a glue and that interlocked the two parts. He believed that the cement had to have some essential features:

- It had to be prepared without unnecessary additives;
- The exact constituents should be published;
- It had to be sterilised with formaldehyde;
- The package should include two measured quantities of barium sulphate to allow the surgeon the choice of different degrees of radio-opacity.

The cement that reflected these features was produced by CMW Laboratories Limited and was called CMW bone cement.

Charnley also realised that it was of fundamental importance to retrieve the artificial joints from patients who had died some years after the surgery, in order to study the wear of the materials and the tissue changes, thus enabling improvements in the procedure.

== Against infection ==
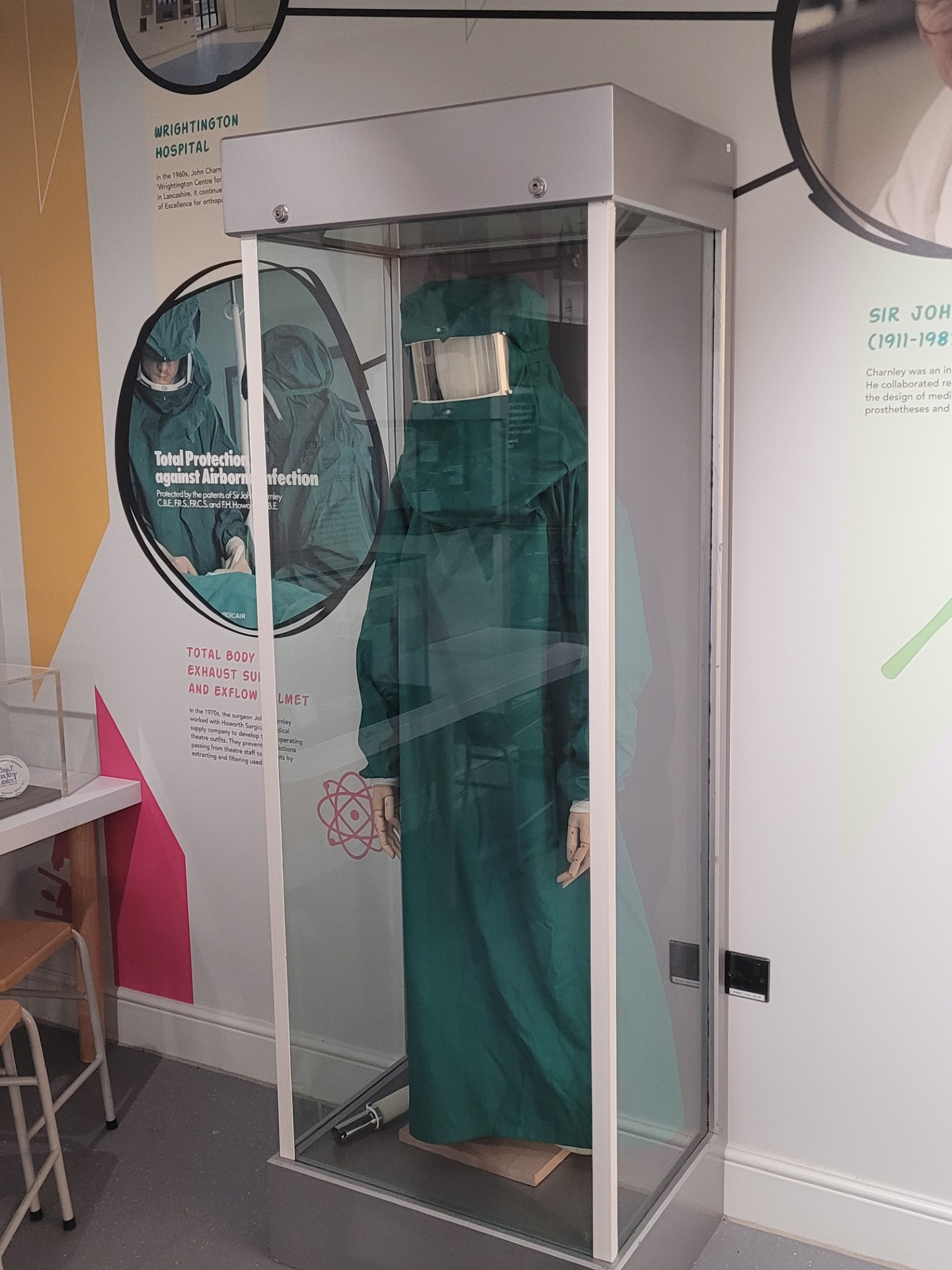
Charnley's surgical exhaust suit, on display at Thackray Museum of Medicine.

The huge number of wound infection cases after hip replacement operations pushed Charnley to put effort also in the prevention field; he was involved in the research of a method to keep bacteria away from the wound during surgery. His first attempt consisted in introducing antibiotics such as gentamicin into the bone cement; the bacterial count decreased, but not enough. In 1961 he developed an enclosure that isolated the operating theatre from the rest of the room, into which filtered air could be passed. To improve his system, he asked F. H. Howorth, whose family firm had been building air filtration systems since 1854, for help. Howorth adapted Charnley's enclosure to provide better air handling and incorporate a diffusion system that allowed the passage of a larger flow of filtered air. Charnley understood that another source of contamination was through the surgeon's gown, and he developed a full-body gown that incorporated an exhaust system. This came into use from the 1970s, and was ventilated so that the surgeon always felt comfortable, whilst maintaining a negative pressure to avoid contamination.

Both the enclosure and the body gown were redesigned and improved over time in order to make them more useful and easier to use.

== Personal life ==
Although not inclined to sporting pastimes as a child, Charnley became a passionate skier as an adult. In 1957, during his annual skiing holiday in Zurs, he met Jill Heaver (1930–2016). Despite a twenty-year difference in ages - she was 26 and he was 46 - they married a few months later, on 15 June. They lived first in a house called "Naemoor" in Hale, in Cheshire, where Charnley immediately converted the attic in his workshop. The couple had two children. In the late 1960s, the Charnleys moved to a larger property in Mere, Cheshire.

== Career ==
John Charnley is recognised as the founder of modern hip replacement. His contributions to the field are found in the hip replacement surgery method, in the optimization of the surgery flows and in the drastic infection rate decrease. Through his teaching activities, he transmitted his technique and knowledge to a wide audience of international surgeons and thus his academic and scientific work was spread worldwide. As of 2011, many of his students were still teaching hip replacement.

In 1974, Charnley was awarded the Cameron Prize for Therapeutics of the University of Edinburgh.

He was awarded the 1975 Lister Medal for his contributions to surgical science. The corresponding Lister Oration, given at the Royal College of Surgeons of England, was delivered on 26 May 1976, and was titled 'The Origins of Post-Operative Sepsis in Elective Surgery'.

Charnley was knighted in 1977.

== Books ==
- Charnley, John (1950). The Closed Treatment of Common Fractures. Churchill Livingstone, Edinburgh and London.
- Charnley, John (1953). Compression Arthrodesis. Churchill Livingstone, Edinburgh and London.

== Bibliography ==
- Waugh, William (1990). John Charnley: The Man and the Hip. Springer-Verlag London Limited. ISBN 978-3-540-19587-0.
- Barker, Philip (2002). Top 1000 Scientists: From The Beginning Of Time To 2000 Ad. Book Guild Publishing. ISBN 978-81-7371-210-4.
