= Charles Thackray =

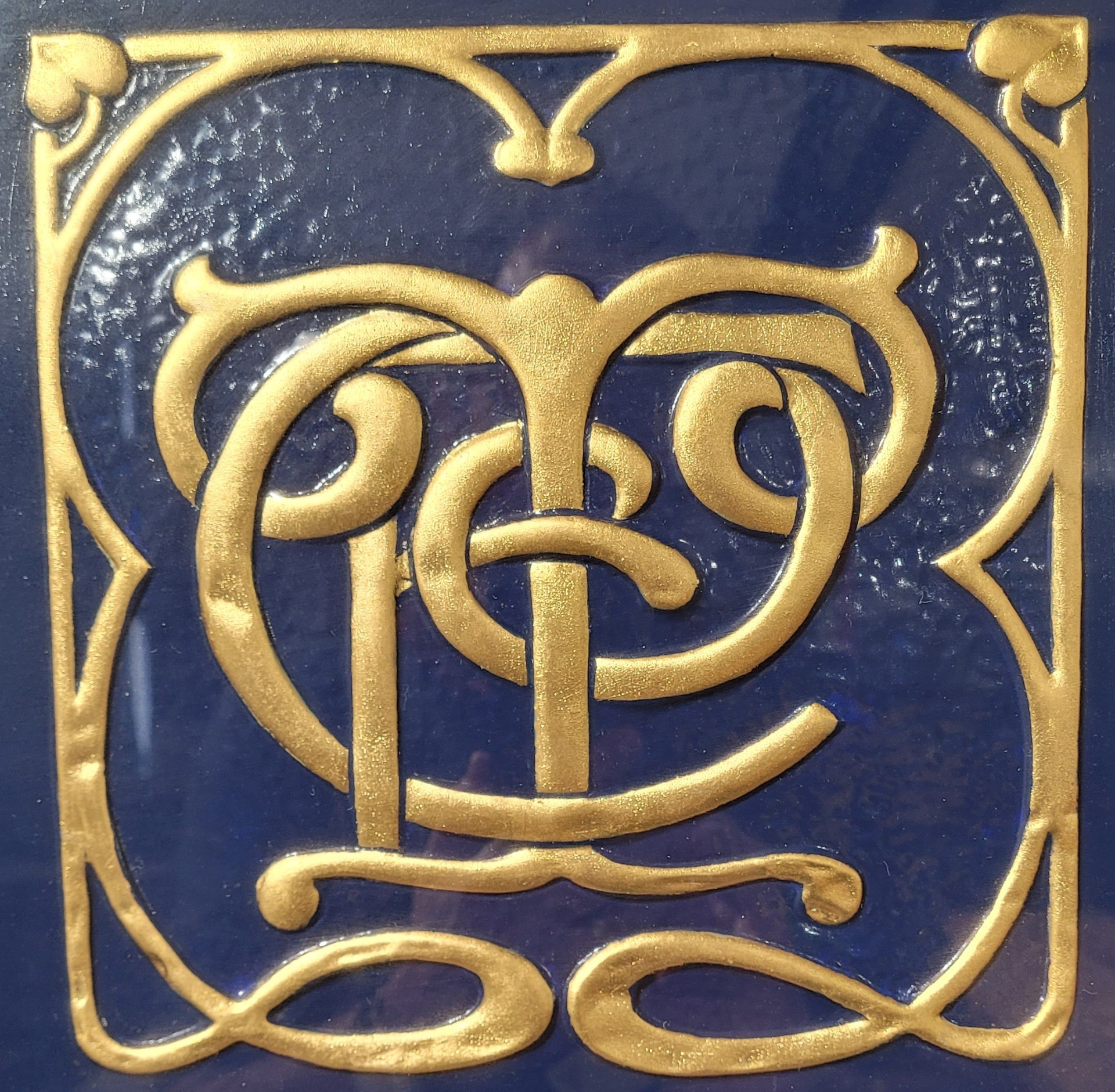
Plaque from Thackray's pharmacy, showing his entwined initials

Charles Frederick Thackray (1877–1934) was a pharmacist and manufacturer of surgical instruments in Leeds.

Thackray began an apprenticeship in pharmacy at the Bradford firm of F. M. Rimmington & Son. He then went to work at the prestigious Squire & Son, Queen Victoria's official chemist's, in the West End of London, and rounded off his education with a spell working on the Continent. He qualified as a pharmacist in 1899 and in 1902 opened a chemist shop in Great George Street, Leeds with his partner Henry Scurrah Wainwright. In 1903 Thackray married Helen Pearce, daughter of a leading Leeds jeweller. They lived in Roundhay, moving to bigger houses as business prospered.

The company bought a sterilizer in 1906 meant to develop another side to the business, supplying sterilized dressings to the Leeds General Infirmary, the nearby Women's and Children's Hospital and neighbouring nursing homes. The early years of the firm coincided with major advances in surgical techniques. Leeds was a centre of high-calibre surgeons, many of whom made their names at the Infirmary; best known was Berkeley Moynihan, 1st Baron Moynihan, who achieved worldwide recognition for his contribution to abdominal surgery. It was Moynihan who first suggested to Charles Thackray that he should make instruments; and the firm, with its experience in repairs at their premises just across the road, was well placed to do so.

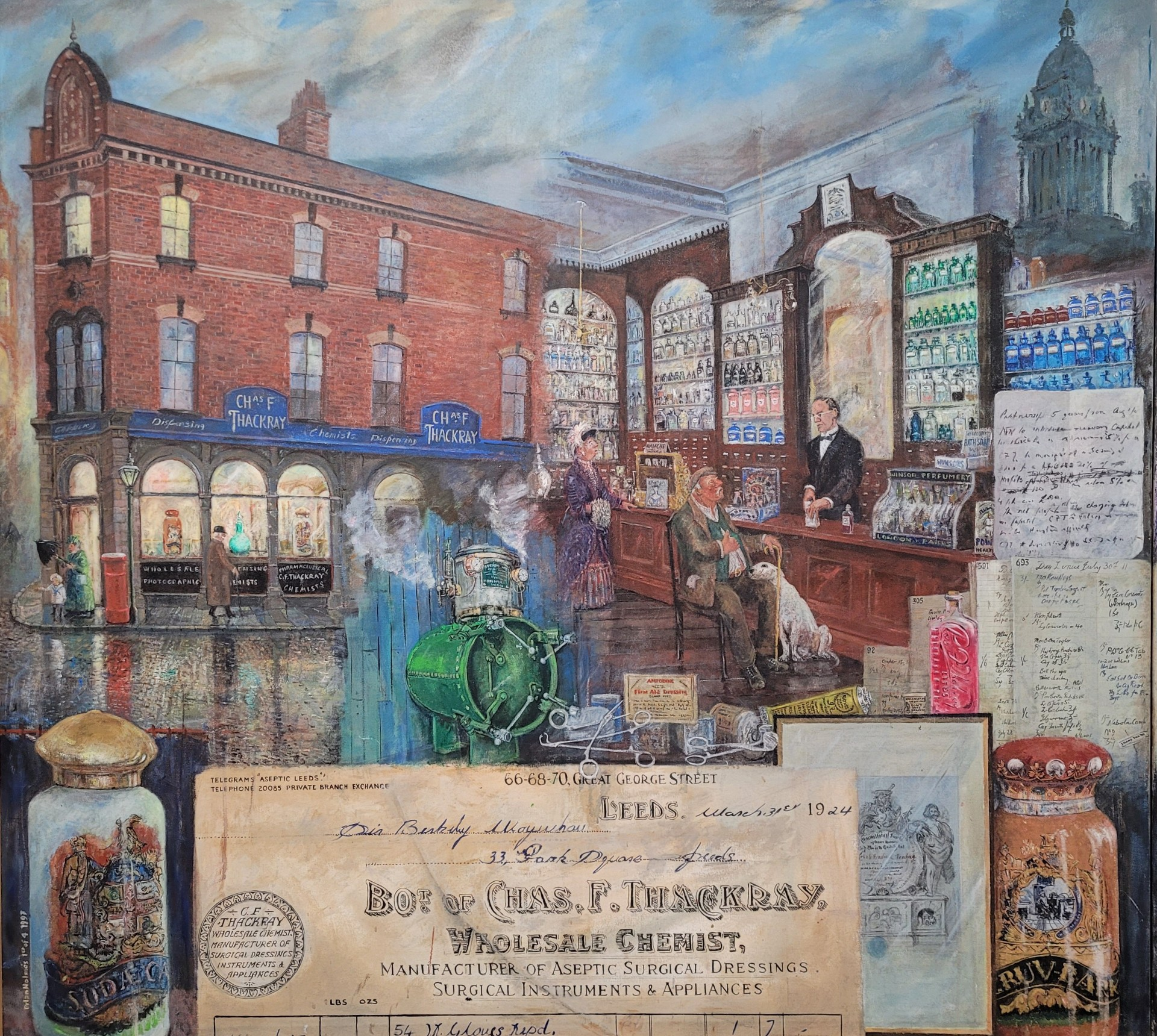
Detail from a mural painted by Brian Holmes for Thackray Museum of Medicine, showing Thackray behind the counter of his pharmacy.

By 1914 Thackray's was employing 25 people, including eight instrument makers and three full-time representatives. Salesmen visited customers over a wide area, supplying wholesale pharmaceuticals not only to hospitals and nursing homes but also to general practitioners serving rural areas. The War Office's acceptance of Thackray's ‘Aseptic’ range as standard field dressings was important to the firm, both ensuring large contracts for drugs and sundries. By 1918 Thackray's employed fourteen instrument makers, out of a total workforce of 32. In the 1930s the firm began to make its own hospital sterilizers, operating tables and other items of theatre furniture.

Charles Thackray died suddenly at the age of 57 in 1934. He failed to return from an evening walk in Roundhay Park near his home and later his body was recovered from Waterloo Lake.

The firm continued to prosper as a limited company and in the 1950s acquired the British Cystoscope Co Ltd, in Clerkenwell, London, and Thomas Rudd Ltd of Sheffield, makers of surgical scissors.

The company was a pioneer in manufacturing replacement hips, having collaborated with the "father" of modern hip replacement surgery, Sir John Charnley. Thackray began manufacturing the Charnley Hip System in 1963 and it is still the best-selling cemented hip system in the world.

The Thackray Museum of Medicine, founded by his grandson Paul Thackray is situated in Harehills, Leeds in the former workhouse building adjacent to St James's University Hospital.
