= Agnes Richter =

Seamstress, noted for emroidered jacket (1844–1918)

Agnes Richter (1844–1918) was a Victorian-era seamstress who is remembered for an embroidered jacket she made while being held in Heidelberg psychiatric hospital.

== Life ==
Richter was born in 1844. When she was in her fifties she was earning her living as a seamstress, when she reported to the police that someone had robbed her. In 1893, Richter was admitted to a Heidelberg psychiatric hospital, at the request of her father and brothers, following what has been recorded as several acute delusional episodes. This led to her being diagnosed as paranoid and she was confined for the rest of her life.

Richter's legacy has survived primarily because of a jacket "diary" that she embroidered with autobiographical text during her lengthy institutionalization. Pieced together from brown wool and coarse institutional linen, the jacket is covered in deutsche schrift, a script which has largely fallen out of use. The lines of red, yellow, blue, orange, and white threaded text are difficult to read, overlapping and obscured through continual use. Fragments of text from Richter's jacket include I am not big, I wish to read, I plunge headlong into disaster. Her case number, 583m, also appears repeatedly.

Life in German asylums at the end of the 19th century was highly regimented. While male patients worked in the grounds or in workshops to manufacture shoes or furniture, female patients were expected to clean, sew, knit, and launder institutional uniforms and textiles. Embracing these technologies in a manner, Richter assembled a jacket that now bear the marks of its use, including sweat stains and a darted back that may have been meant to accommodate a physical deformity or hunchback.

The jacket was collected by Hans Prinzhornn in the early 20th century. Since its rediscovery in 1980, the jacket has become an iconic piece in the Prinzhorn Collection at Heidelberg. Similar examples of asylum artistry from the nineteenth and twentieth centuries include Lorina Bulwer's samplers and Myrllen's Coat.
