= Thackray Museum of Medicine =

Coordinates: 53°48′29″N 1°31′06″W

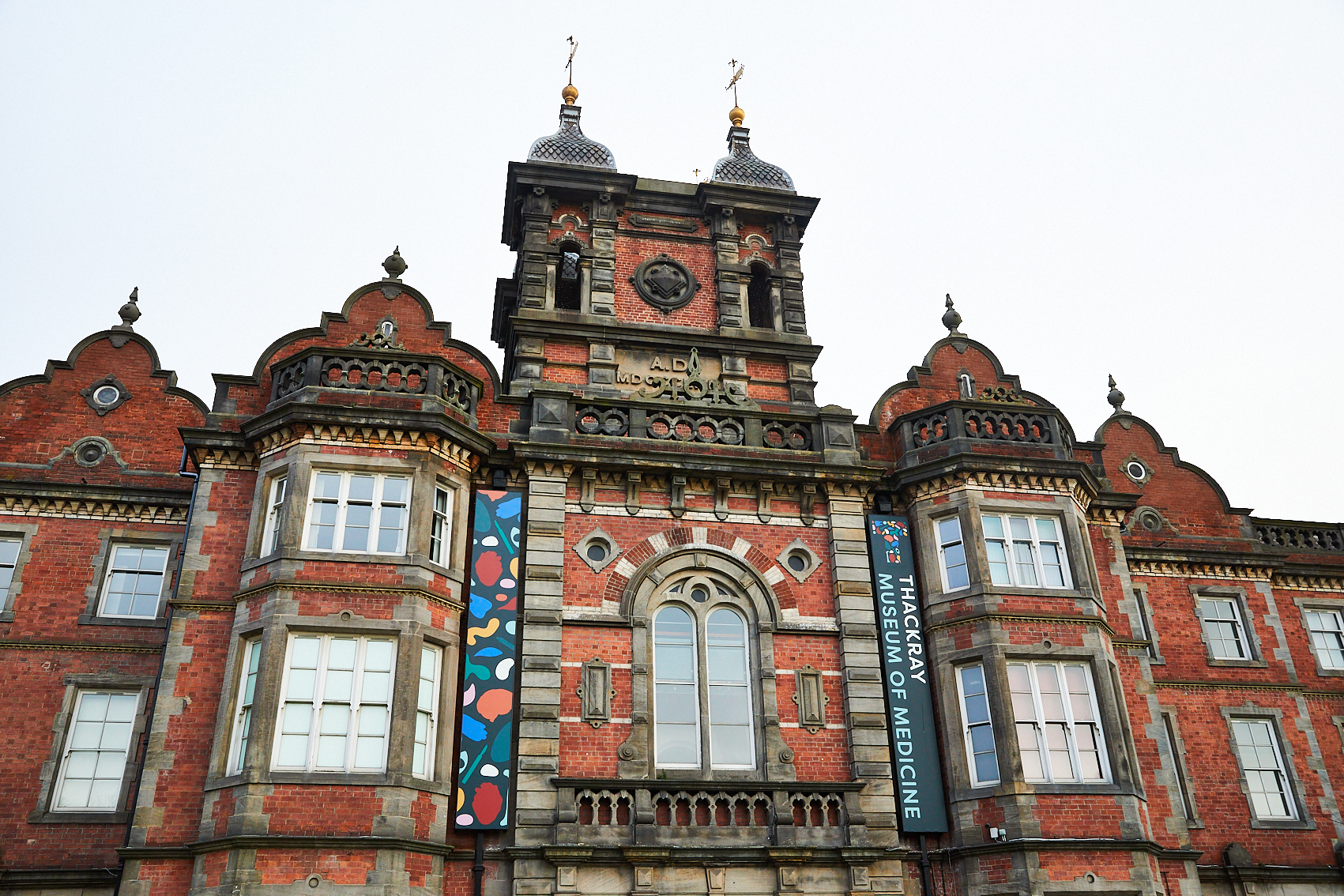
- Museum entrance
- Established: March 1997
- Location: Beckett Street, Leeds, West Yorkshire, England
- Type: Medical museum
- CEO: Edward Appleyard
- Curator: Dr. Jack Gann
- Website: www.thackraymuseum.co.uk

The Thackray Museum of Medicine in Leeds, West Yorkshire, England, is a museum of the history of medicine adjacent to St James's University Hospital. It opened in March 1997 as the Thackray Medical Museum. In 1998 it won "Museum of the Year" and has other awards including in 2004 both the "Excellence in England Small Tourist Attraction of the Year" and "Sandford Award for Heritage Education".

The museum closed temporarily in 2019 for a £4 million refurbishment, while the museum conference centre and car park remained open, and remained closed because of the COVID-19 pandemic. The museum reopened its doors on 17 May 2021. The redeveloped museum has since been shortlisted for Art Fund's Museum of the Year award 2021 and received a special commendation from the European Museum Forum in 2023.

== History ==
The building is a Grade II listed building, the former Leeds Union Workhouse, which opened in 1861 (foundation stone laid 1858) to accommodate 784 paupers. By the end of the 19th century, the buildings had become largely used for medical care of the poor, rather than workhouse and training. During the First World War it was called the East Leeds War Hospital, caring for armed services personnel. After becoming part of St James's Hospital, the building housed the first geriatric ward in the north of England. The building was later known as the Ashley Wing, which was part of the hospital until the 1990s when the old Leeds Union Workhouse building was considered unfit for modern medicine. As a listed building, it could not be demolished and Parliament gave permission for it to house the Thackray Medical Museum, which opened in 1997.

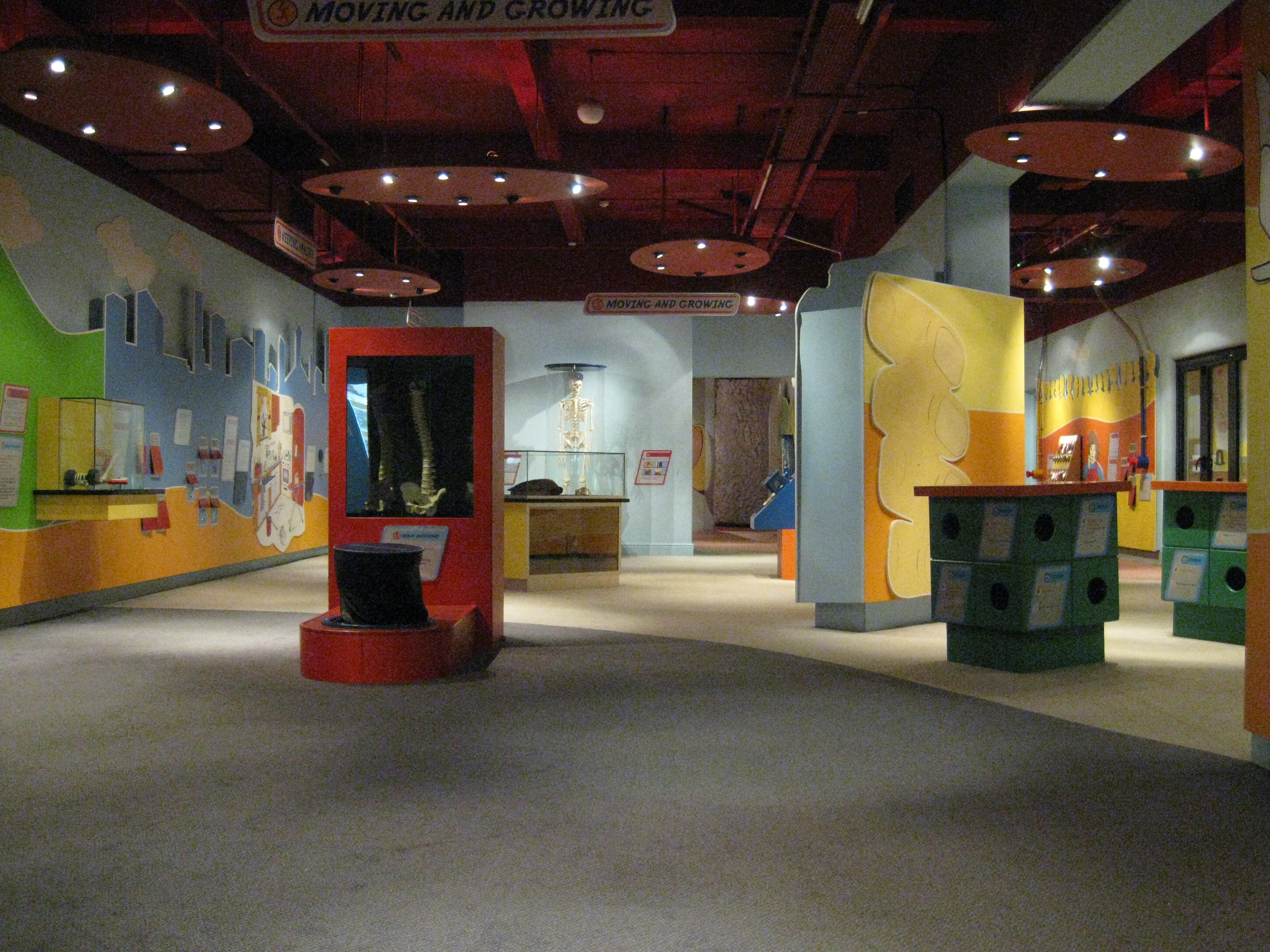
Museum galleries before the 2019 closure

The museum's origins can be traced to Great George Street, Leeds, where Charles Thackray opened a small family-run chemist shop in 1902. In less than a century the corner shop grew into one of Britain's principal medical companies, Chas F Thackray Limited, manufacturing drugs and medical instruments and pioneering the hip replacement operation alongside Sir John Charnley. In the 1980s Charles Thackray's grandson Paul Thackray established a small collection as an archive of the Leeds-based medical supplies company. In 1990 a charitable trust was established to develop the collection.

Before the redevelopment, highlights included Leeds 1842: Life in Victorian Leeds, Pain, Pus and Blood, describing the history of surgery and pain relief, Having a Baby focusing on developments in safety for childbirth and The LifeZone!, an interactive children's gallery, looking at how the human body works, with a smaller room for the under-fives.

=== COVID-19 ===
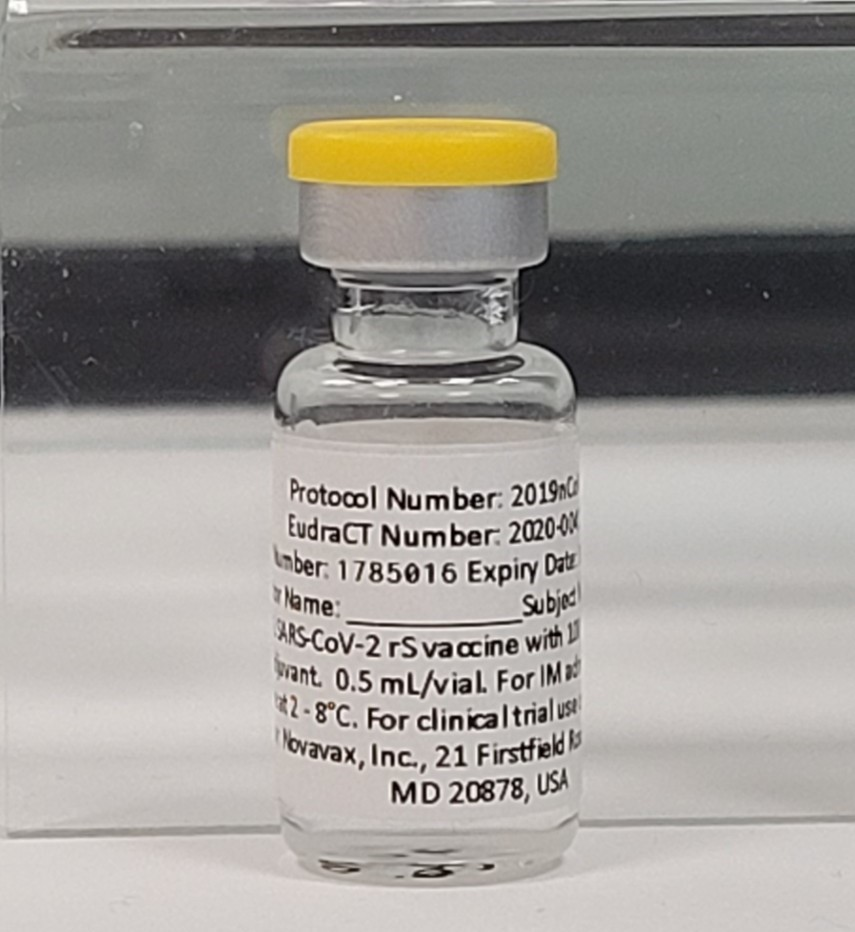
Novavax vaccine from trials conducted at the museum

The museum's redevelopment project coincided with the outbreak of the COVID-19 pandemic in 2020, delaying plans to reopen to the public. In October 2020 it was announced that the museum was to receive £370,000 from the Culture Recovery Fund to help it to re-open safely. While closed due to the pandemic, the Thackray became the first museum in the UK to act as a COVID-19 vaccination hub. Following its reopening, the museum also hosted Phase 3 trials for the Novavax COVID-19 vaccine. Examples of the vaccines used by the vaccine hub and Novavax trials are now part of the museum's permanent collection.

While the museum was closed due to the pandemic, it hosted an online exhibition in collaboration with the University of Huddersfield on Mothers in Lockdown.

== Museum displays ==
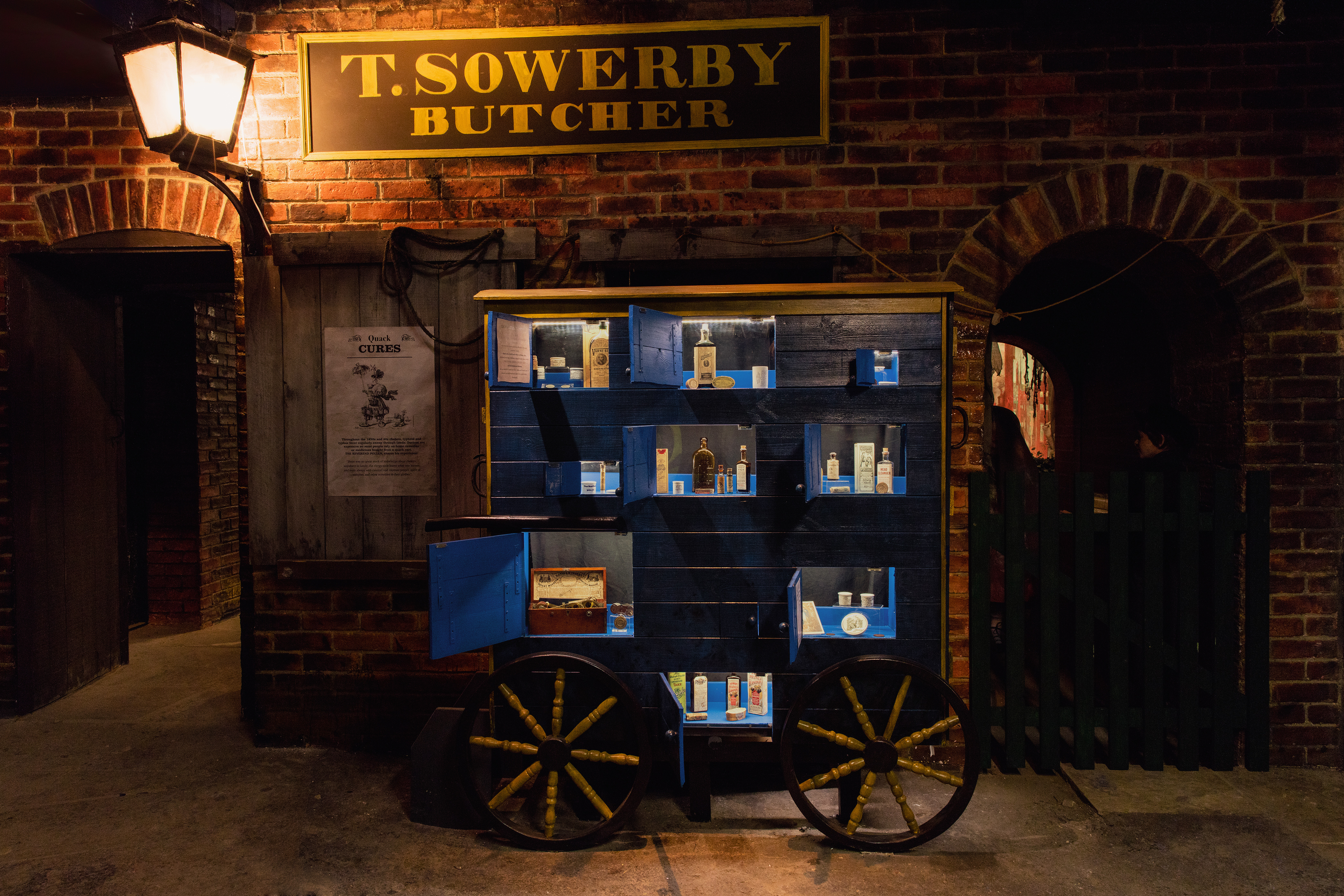
Disease Street

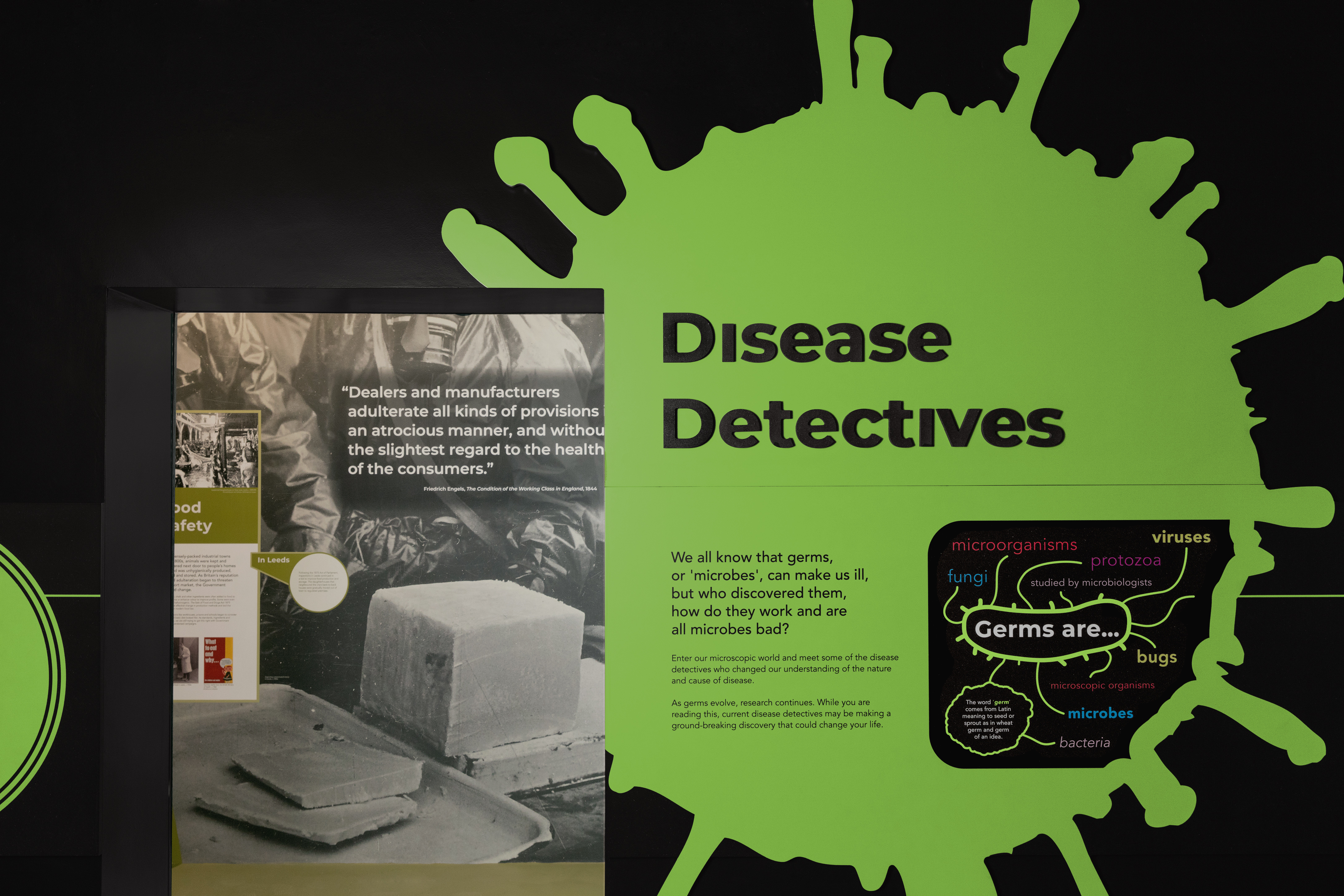
Disease Detectives

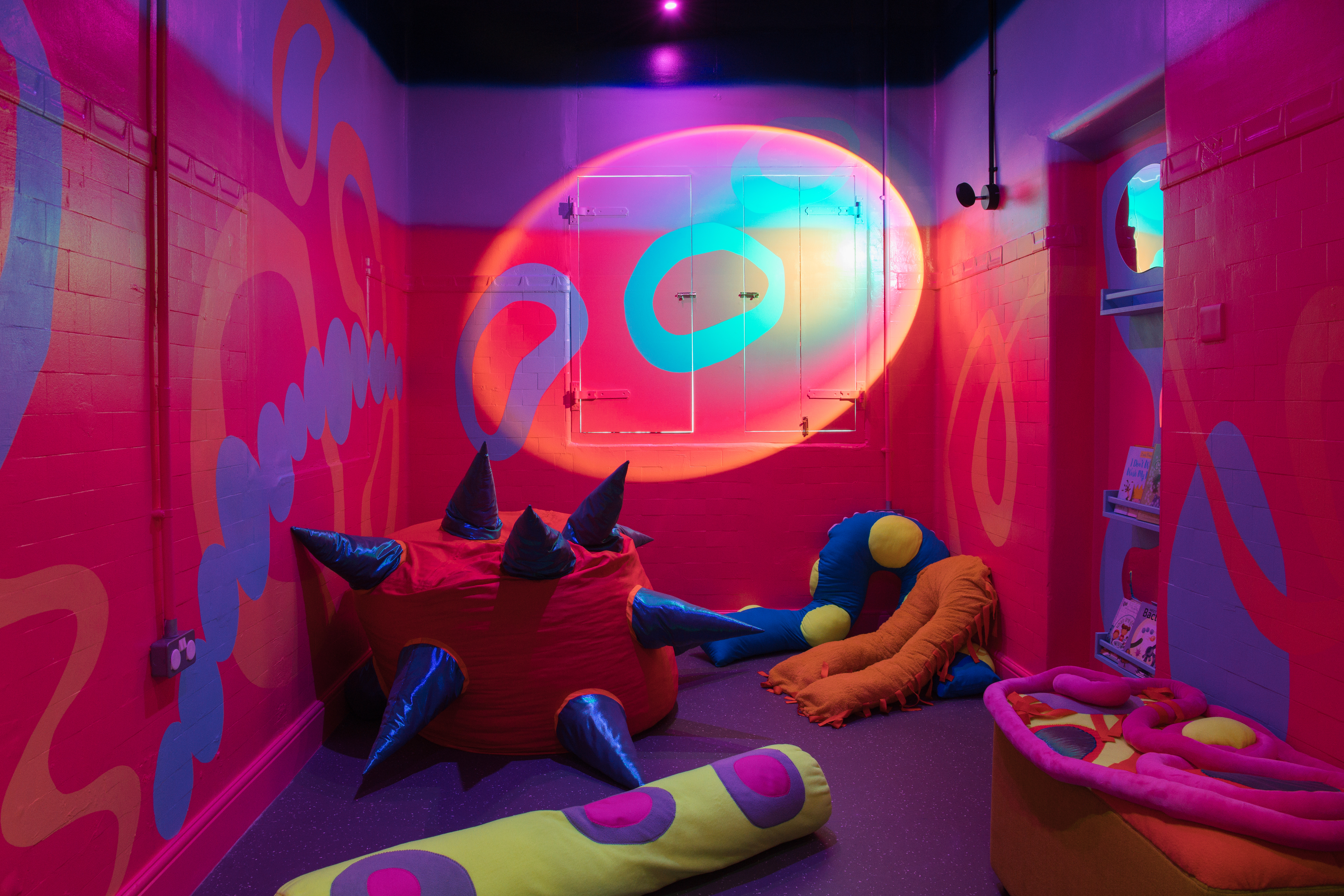
Disease Den

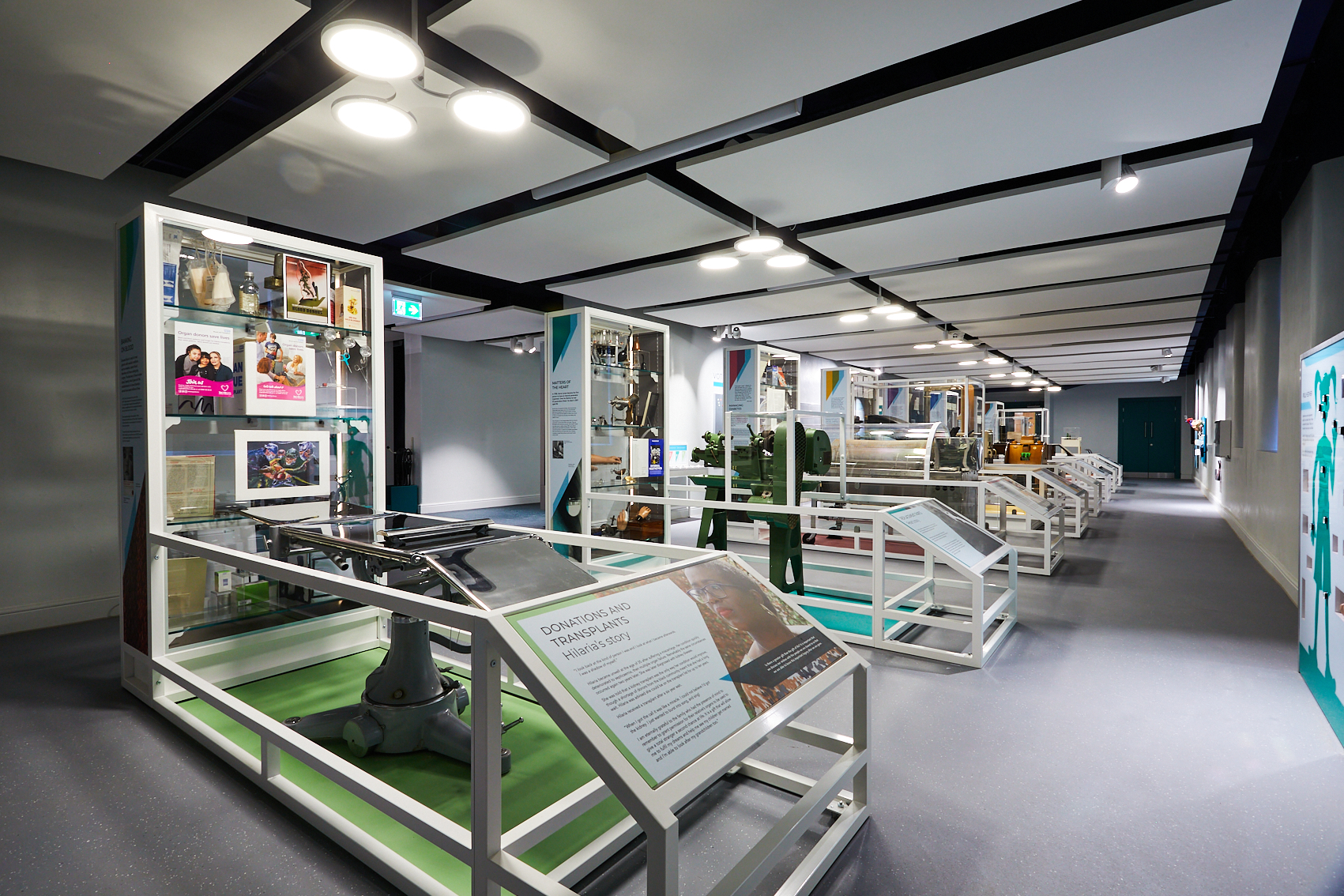
Cutting Edge

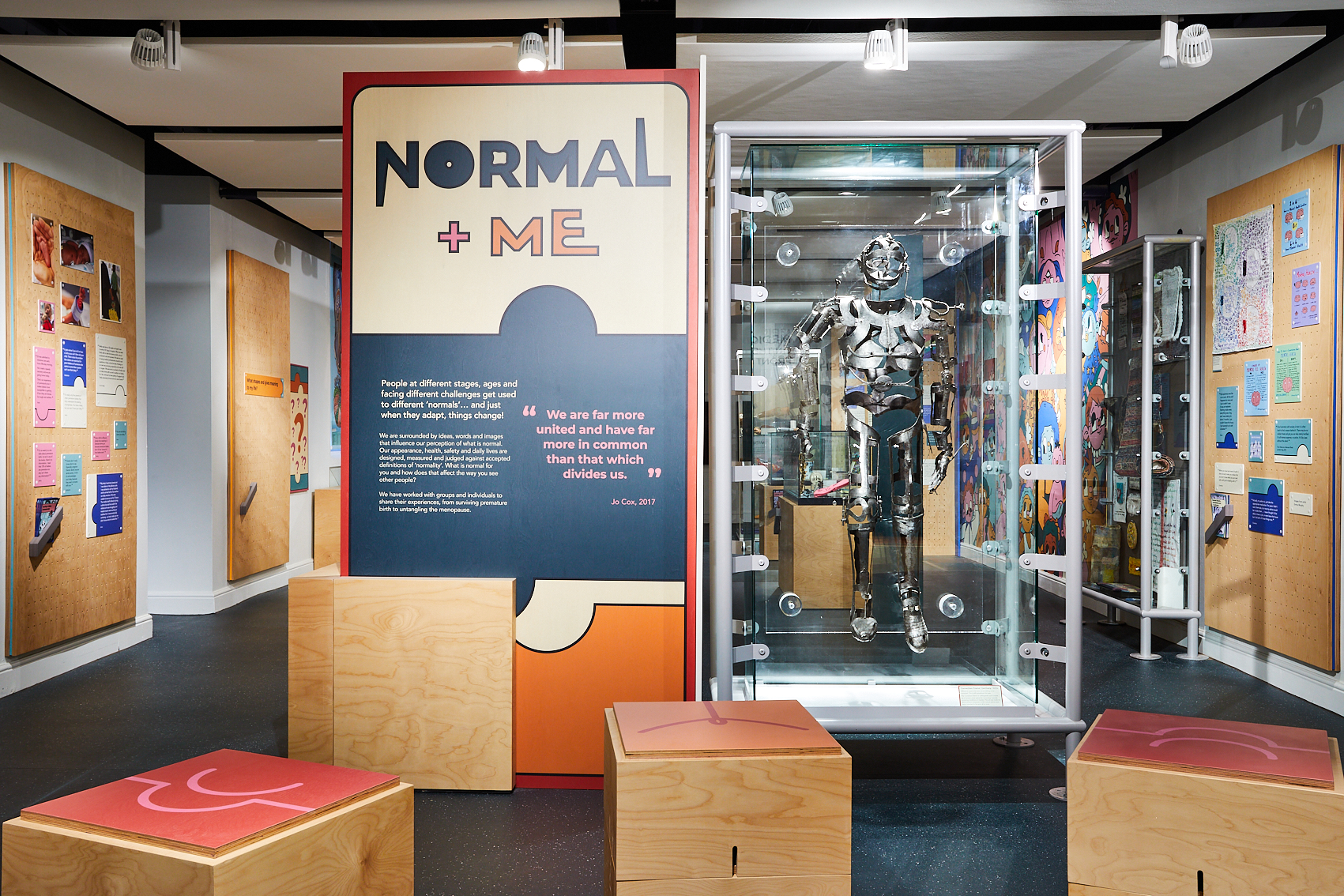
Normal+Me

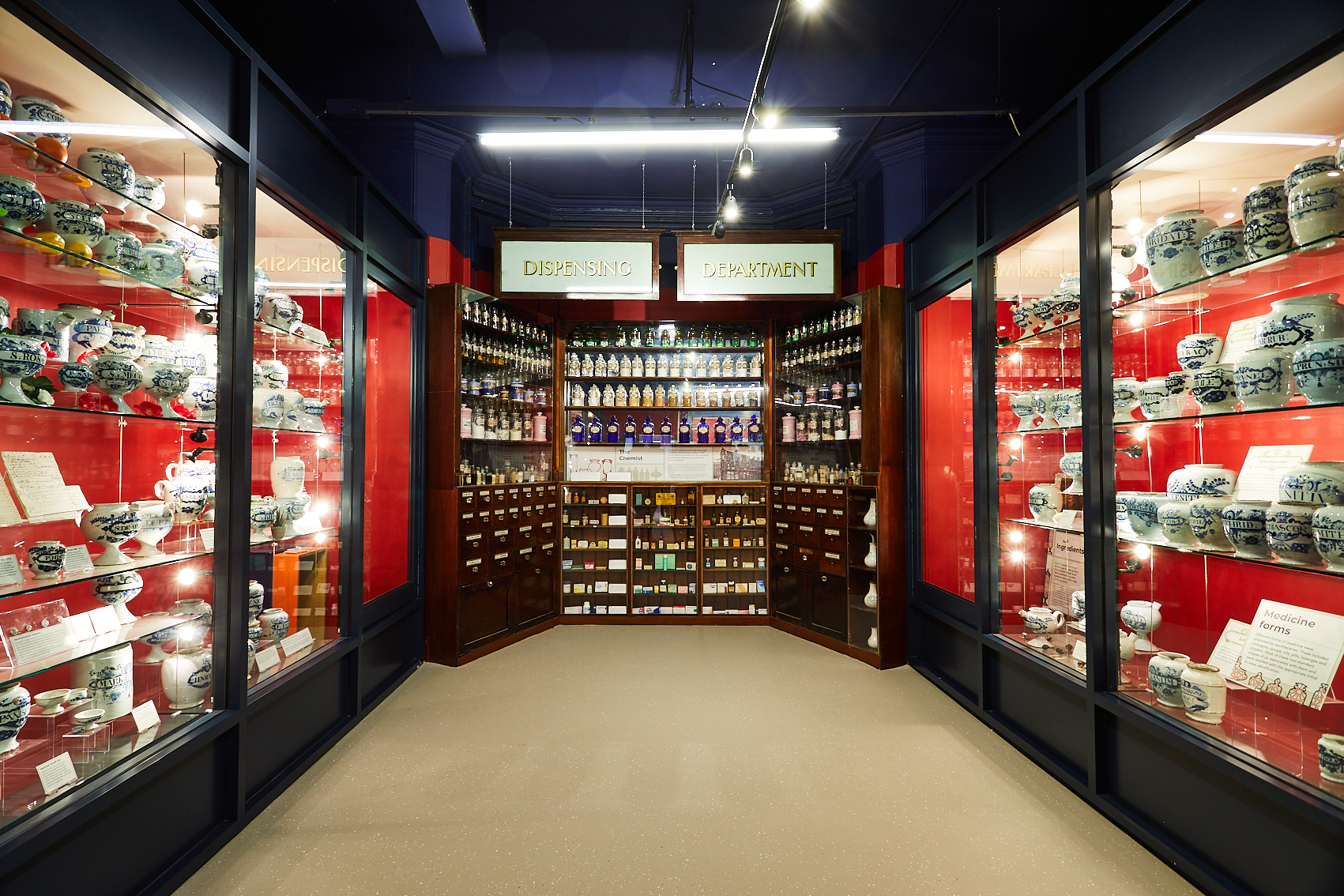
Apothecary

The museum contains eleven permanent galleries and a temporary exhibition gallery. Disease Street recreates the sights, sounds and smells of a slum in Victorian Leeds, following the stories of the inhabitants and the health issues that they would face. The Victorian Operating Theatre tells the story of surgery in the age before antiseptics and anaesthetics, featuring a film of "Hannah Dyson's Ordeal": recreating the amputation of a mill girl's leg. Making Us Well, Outside In showcases the Victorian public health movement, from tackling air pollution to sewers. Disease Detectives explores medical science in the wake of germ theory and our understanding of the world of microbes. It includes a chill out, reading and relaxing area called Disease Den. In Cutting Edge the museum highlights medical innovation and ingenuity, while Response to Crisis explores how medical advances leap forward in times of emergency such as war and pandemics. This area includes a 1970s-style sexual health clinic. Normal + Me is a co-curated gallery exploring different perspectives on what it means to be "normal". Who Cares? is a gallery about all the different people and professions who help care for us and The Apothecary showcases the history of making and prescribing medicine from the 1600s to today.

The museum also contains Sparks!, a play space for children under five, involving medical-themed role play and soft play. This can be accessed as part of the museum ticket or booked on its own.

== Temporary exhibitions ==
The museum hosts two temporary exhibitions a year. Recent exhibitions have included On the Bench (2023), which told stories of sporting injuries with contributions from former Leeds Rhinos captain Stevie Ward and Leeds Roller Derby.

Fragile Microbiomes (2024) was a solo show for bioartist Anna Dumitriu, blending contemporary art and microbiology to explore the history of infectious disease and "delve into the intricacies of the microbial world."

You Choose (2024) arose from a collaboration with medical humanities researchers at the University of Leeds on the LivingBodiesObjects project. It explored personalised medicine and how personal choices can influence healthcare and how healthcare is influenced by individual needs. It looked at contemporary subjects in medical technology including AI, 3D printing and digital twins.

Blood: Ties and Tensions (2025) explored the symbolism and social relationships focused around blood and blood donation. It was produced in partnership with anthropologists at the University of Leeds.

POO! (2025) was a playful, interactive, family exhibition themed around faeces and digestion. It was styled as a 'Poo Lab' and designed with children from Harehills Primary School. It was nominated for Best Temporary Exhibition at the Museums + Heritage Awards.

Beneath the Sheets: Anatomy, Art and Power (2026) was an art exhibition displaying historic anatomical illustrations, exploring the social and cultural contexts behind them and the power dynamics that they reveal. It featured the work of surgeon-anatomist Joseph Maclise and his rare depiction of a Black body in a Victorian anatomical atlas.

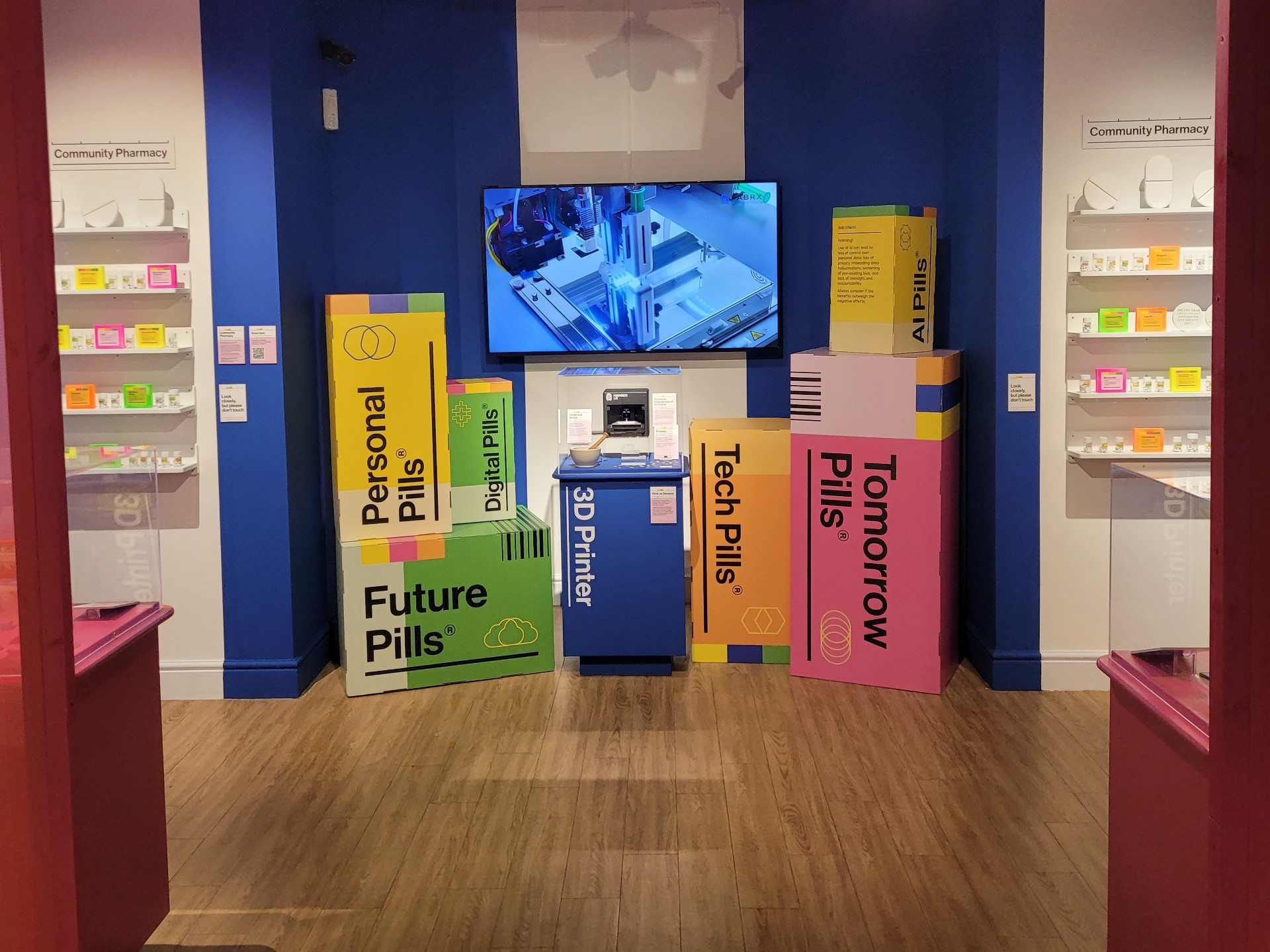
A 3D pharmaceutical printer on display during the You Choose exhibition

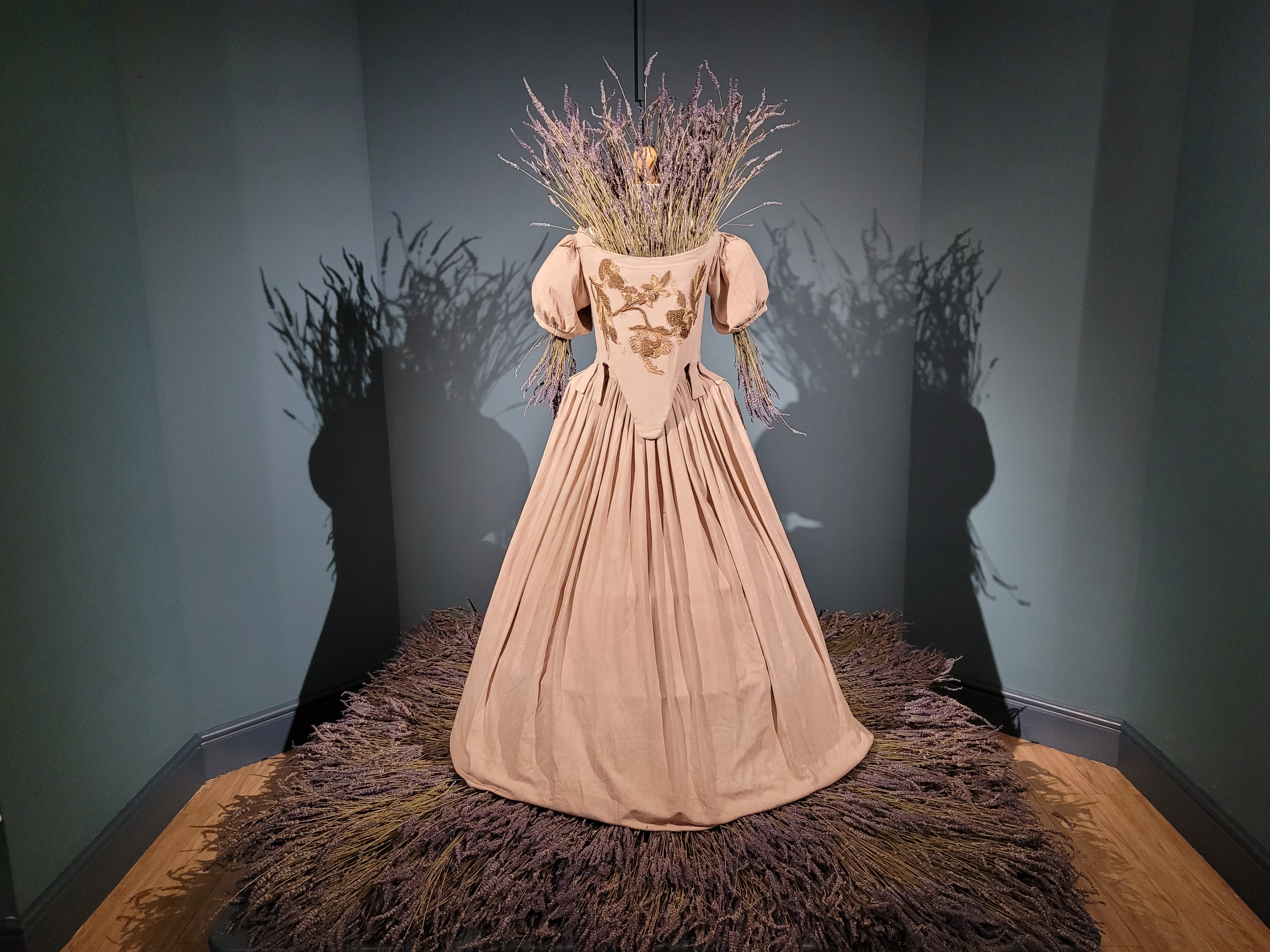
Plague Dress by Anna Dumitriu, on display during the Fragile Microbiomes exhibition

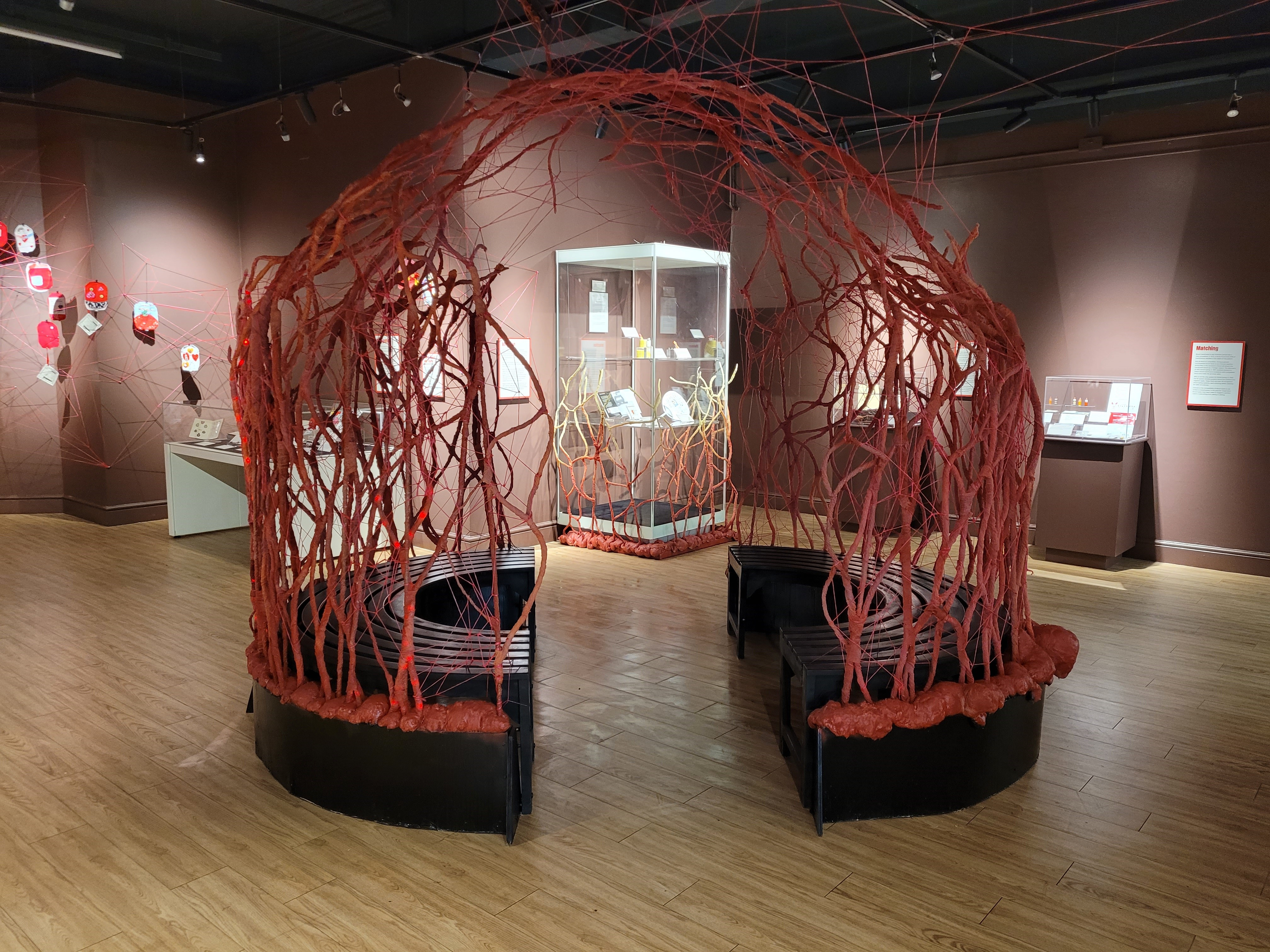
Vessel, a sculpture by Gemma Wood, on display as part of the Blood: Ties and Tensions exhibition.

== Collection ==
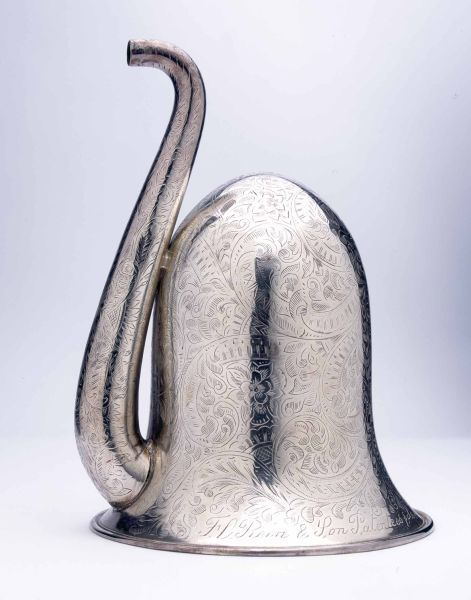
Hearing aid belonging to Queen Victoria, part of the museum's nationally significant audiology collection.

The Thackray Museum of Medicine houses a collection of over 47,000 objects from medical history which date from Roman times to the present day, along with 15,000 trade catalogues and 9,000 books on medicine and healthcare. Highlights include Prince Albert's personal medicine chest and an expressionist sampler sewn by workhouse inmate Lorina Bulwer. The strengths of the collection include European surgical instruments from the 1600s to today; a "nationally significant collection" of hearing aids including the British Society of Audiology collection; the J F Wilkinson Pharmaceutical Ceramics Collection; patent medicines, and domestic first aid kits. These can be accessed via an online collections database.

== Education and learning ==
Visited by 20,000 school students each year the museum delivers a series of in-classroom work and education resources, loans boxes and teacher events. The museum has been awarded the Sandford Award for Heritage Education.

The museum offers a medicine and history public lecture series on Saturday mornings which runs from October to March each year. Lectures focus on the changing nature of health and medicine.

== See also ==
- Listed buildings in Leeds (Gipton and Harehills Ward)
