= Anna Dumitriu =

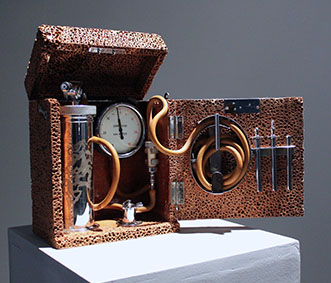
- Pneumothorax Machine by Anna Dumitriu
- Born: 1969 (age 56–57); Brighton, UK
- Education: University of Brighton
- Known for: Visual Arts, Bioart
- Notable work: The Romantic Disease, Make Do and Mend, ArchaeaBot: A Post Singularity and Post Climate Change Life-form The Institute of Unnecessary Research Trust me, I'm an artist: towards an ethics of art/science collaboration
- Movement: BioArt

Anna Dumitriu (born 1969) is a pioneering visual artist based in Brighton, England, specialising in BioArt. Her installations, interventions and performances use digital, biological and traditional media including bacteria, digital technology and craft techniques, working with diverse audiences.

Dumitriu's work is at the forefront of art and science collaborative practice, particularly working with microbiology, infectious diseases, robotics, artificial life technology, and art/science ethics. She was the 2018 President of the Science and the Arts Section of the British Science Association. She is involved in public engagement in science, arts in healthcare and has taught of art/science practice to artists, scientists, art students and medical/science students internationally. She is Artist in Residence with Modernising Medical Microbiology at The University of Oxford, and at the National Collection of Type Cultures at Public Health England. Additionally Dumitriu holds Visiting Research Fellowship: Artist in Residence roles at The University of Hertfordshire in the Biocomputation Group in the School of Computer Science, and in Brighton and Sussex Centre for Global Health Research at Brighton and Sussex Medical School. She was formerly a visiting research fellow: artist in residence in the Centre for Computational Neuroscience and Robotics, part of the School of Informatics at Sussex University between 2005 and 2014. She was co-chair of the Arts and Culture Subcommittee of the Alan Turing Centenary. Dumitriu is founder and Director of the Institute of Unnecessary Research and was lead artist on the "Trust me, I'm an artist: towards an ethics of art/science collaboration" project working with the Waag Society in Amsterdam and co-author of the book of the same name. She has written extensively on the notion of the "bacterial sublime".

Her work has an international exhibition profile and has been featured in Frieze, Artforum Wired UK and The Lancet.

Her "Romantic Disease" project explores around historical and contemporary notions of Tuberculosis, whole genome sequencing of bacteria, global health and antimicrobial resistance.

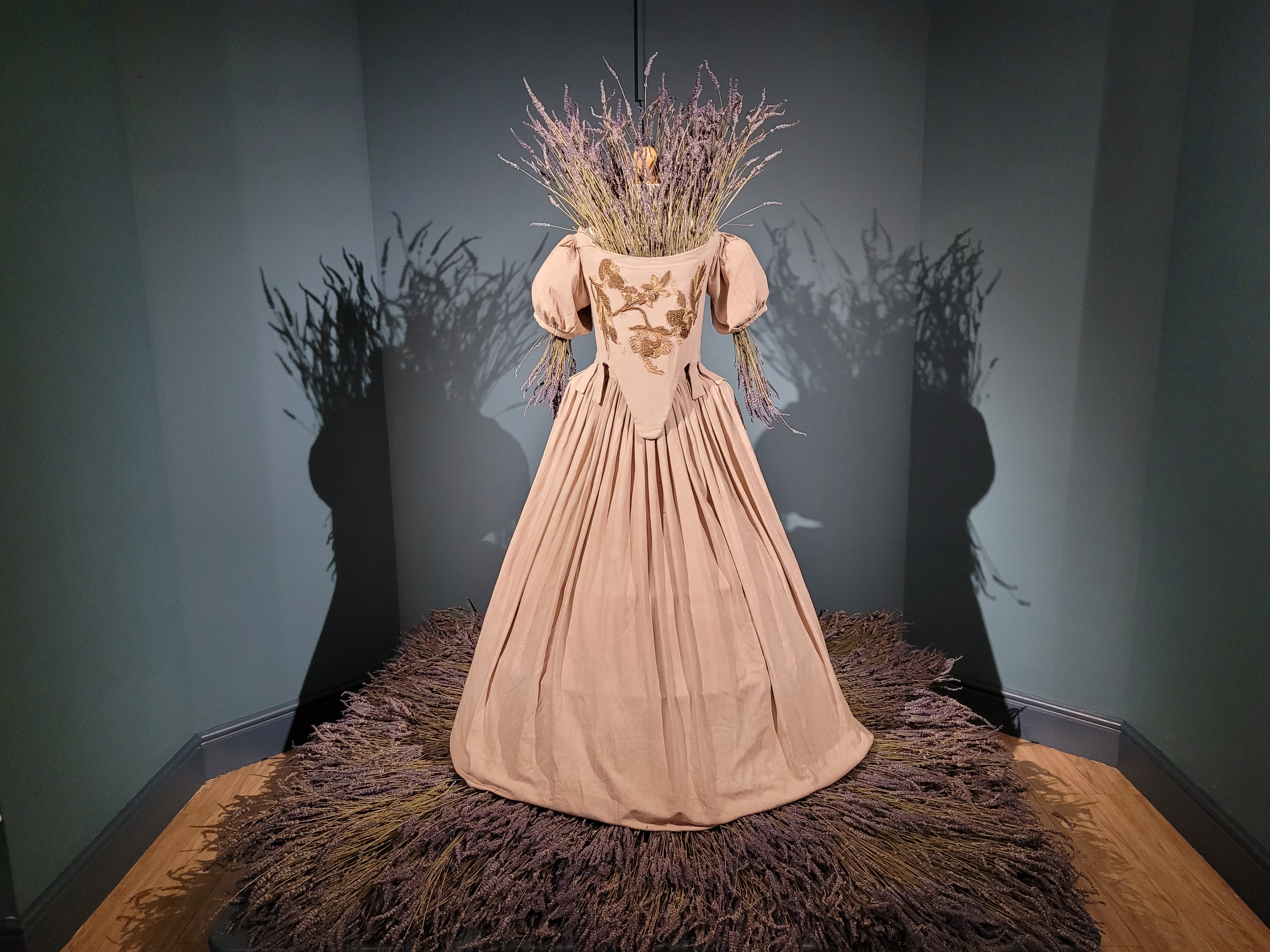
Plague Dress by Anna Dumitriu, on display at the Thackray Museum of Medicine

Recent artwork focusses on synthetic biology, antibiotic resistance, and sequencing of bacterial DNA. She created "Make Do and Mend" in 2017 which uses the CRISPR gene editing technique of homologous recombination to edit the genome of E. coli bacteria to remove an antibiotic resistance gene and replace it with the phrase "Make Do and Mend" written into its DNA. The CRISPR Journal described the project as "perhaps the first application of CRISPR gene editing technology in BioArt" and continued "To date, the pioneer in using CRISPR technology for Bio-Art is Anna Dumitriu, a well known British bio-artist. Dumitriu conceived, developed, and exhibited for the first time in 2017 an artwork based on the use of CRISPR at the LifeSpace Gallery for science and art research (Dundee, United Kingdom) as part of the Future Emerging Art and Technology exhibition."

In 2024, the Thackray Museum of Medicine in Leeds hosted a solo exhibition of Dumitriu's work, Fragile Microbiomes, including existing pieces and brand new works.

In January 2014, Dumitriu told The Guardian: "Art, for me, is a way of investigating the world. In that way, I see no real distinction between art and science at all."
