= Lorina Bulwer =

British artist (1838–1912)

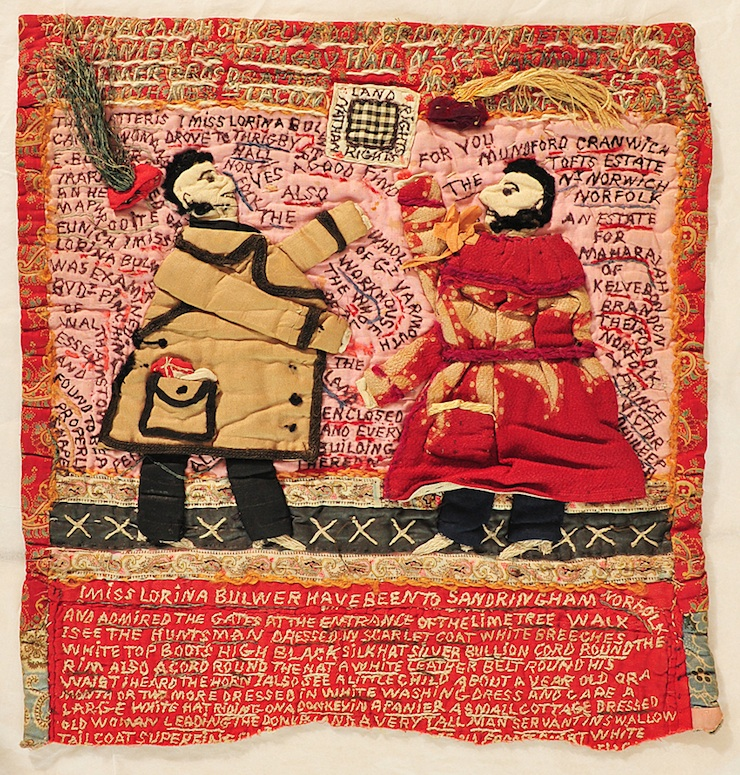
- part of Bulwer's work
- Born: 1838; Beccles, England
- Died: 5 March 1912 (aged 73–74); Great Yarmouth, England

Lorina Bulwer (1838 – 5 March 1912) was a British needleworker. She was placed in a workhouse at Great Yarmouth at some point between 1893-1901 and there she created several pieces of needlework which have been featured on BBCTV and which can now be found in the Norwich Castle Museum. The needlework are long expressionist samplers which document her anger and indignation during that time in her life.

== Life ==
Bulwer was born in 1838 in Beccles, a small town located in Suffolk. Her parents were William John Bulwer and Ann Bulwer (born Turner). Some time before 1861 her family moved to Great Yarmouth. Her father died in 1871 and she then worked running a guest house until her mother died in 1893. She is thought to have been placed in Great Yarmouth Workhouse by her brother Edgar shortly after and he would have paid to leave her there. The workhouse had 500 inmates, including about 60, like Lorina, who had mental disorders and were classified as "lunatics". They would have unpicked oakum for up to 10 hours a day.

Bulwer embroidered long messages that can read as a letters of protest or outrage. The material is cotton and it has been embroidered with different colour wools. One of the letters is twelve feet long and another is 14 feet (4.3 m). The sampler auctioned by Christie's in 2002 and now held by Norwich Castle Museum is 15.8 feet long (4.8 m). The text is all in upper case and lacks any punctuation. In the text she tries to connect her family with the Bulwer-Lyttons of Knebworth House or the royal family or the Bulwer family of Heydon Hall. Some of the parts of her message can be verified as they refer to real people. At other points she talks about fantasies of being related to the royal family. At other times she hints that she was sexually abused – "I MISS LORINA BULWER WAS EXAMINED BY DR PINCHING OF WALTHAMSTOW ESSEX AND FOUND TO BE A PROPERLY SHAPED FEMALE". Dr. Richard Lloyd Pinching of Walthamstow, Essex, was implicated in the sexual abuse of a fourteen-year-old girl in early 1859, in what was then called the "Walthamstow Scandal".

Bulwer died of influenza on 5 March 1912 and she was buried close to the workhouse at Caister Cemetery.

== Legacy ==
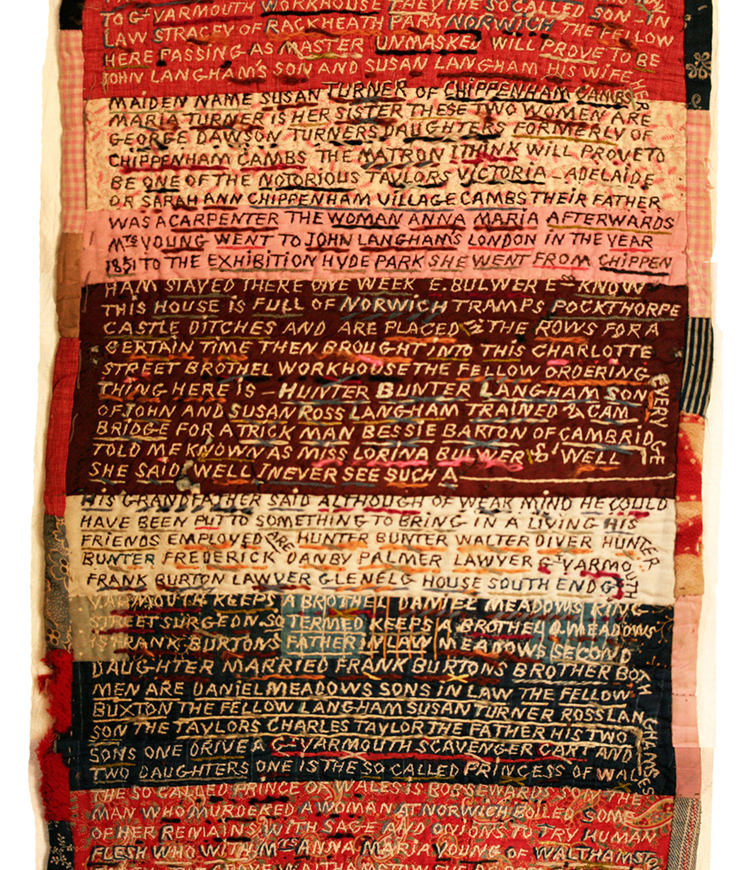
The text is all in uppercase and lacks any punctuation

The needlework that she created went into private ownership and at one time was for sale in the local market. One of Lorina's needleworks was sold in 2002 for just over £1,800 when it was thought it might have been made by Rosina Bulwer Lytton about her husband. Lorina's work is now in Norwich Castle Museum where the curators refer to her work as "Lorina". The museum bought the first part of her needlework in 2004. It was later discovered that there was a similar embroidery by Bulwer in the Thackray Museum of Medicine in Leeds, which was dated to two years later than the first. It was possible to date the embroideries as Bulwer made references to real events like the death of a fellow inmate.

The Dr Pinching of Walthamstow referred to in the embroideries was initially thought to be untraceable, but his story was finally uncovered in 2015 by genealogist Penelope Hemingway. Dr Pinching was involved in a court case where a man he was tending to was alleged to have torn up his will and Pinching's account was questioned. During this investigation he explained the circumstance which had happened before he resigned from the Infant Orphan Asylum in Walthamstow in 1859. He said that he had written letters to a "15 year old girl" and then he had been asked by the family to seduce her as he said he was the "family's intimate friend". No charges were brought against him when he resigned.

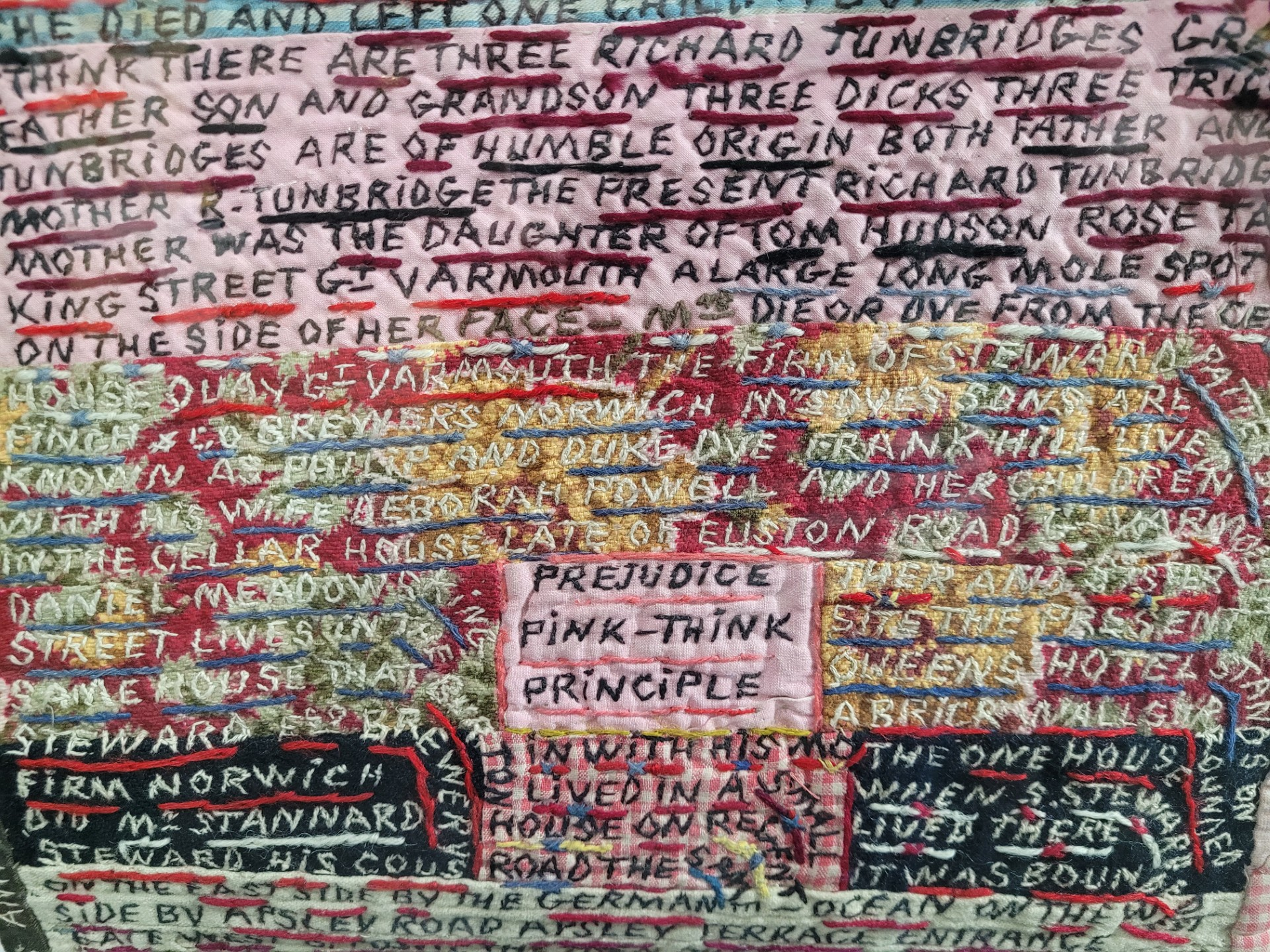
Detail of the sampler at Thackray Museum of Medicine

Bulwer's needlework was discussed during series 36 of the Antiques Roadshow and later they were featured in a spin-off program called Antiques Roadshow Detective. Lorina and her needle-craft was the main feature of a BBC program that investigated the story behind the textiles and the artist who created them. The additional publicity revealed that a viewer had the records for the workhouse where Bulwer was cared for. These are also now held by the museum, although they do not mention Bulwer.

A third sampler by Bulwer was discovered where it had been abandoned in an attic in County Durham. The largest piece found was two metres (6 ft 7 in) in length and when discovered it was identified very rapidly by an internet search for "Lorina Bulwer". This search revealed all the publicity that surrounded the re-discovery of the first two letters/samplers. The discoverers were placed in contact with Norwich museum and funding was obtained to also bring this work into the collection where it was exhibited in 2014 in Great Yarmouth.

== See also ==
Other examples of similar art include Agnes Richter's coat and Myrellen's Coat. In 2022, Dolly Sen published in Great Yarmouth where she lived, the Lorina Bulwer pamphlet.
