= Bulwer-Lytton =

Bulwer-Lytton is a surname, and may refer to:

- Edward Bulwer-Lytton, 1st Baron Lytton (1803–1873), novelist and politician
- Rosina Bulwer Lytton (1802–1882), feminist writer and wife of Edward Bulwer-Lytton
- Robert Bulwer-Lytton, 1st Earl of Lytton (1831–1891), statesman, poet and son of Edward Bulwer-Lytton and Rosina Bulwer Lytton
- Victor Bulwer-Lytton, 2nd Earl of Lytton (1876–1947), politician
- Neville Bulwer-Lytton, 3rd Earl of Lytton (1879–1951), military officer and artist

== See also ==
- Bulwer (disambiguation)
- Earl of Lytton; later earls used the surnames Lytton-Milbanke and Lytton
- Bulwer-Lytton Fiction Contest
